

Deaths in March

 11: Merlin Olsen
 25: Chet Simmons

Current sporting seasons

Australian rules football 2010

Australian Football League

Auto racing 2010

Formula One
Sprint Cup

IRL IndyCar Series
World Rally Championship

Nationwide Series
Camping World Truck Series

WTTC
V8 Supercar
American Le Mans

Rolex Sports Car Series

Super GT

Basketball 2010

NBA
NCAA Division I men
NCAA Division I women
Euroleague
EuroLeague Women
Eurocup
EuroChallenge

Australia
France
Germany
Greece
Iran
Israel
Italy
Philippines
Fiesta Conference
Spain
Turkey

Cricket 2009–2010

Australia:
Sheffield Shield
Ford Ranger Cup
Bangladesh:
National League

India:
Ranji Trophy
Premier League
New Zealand:
Plunket Shield
Pakistan:
Quaid-i-Azam Trophy
South Africa:
SuperSport Series
Sri Lanka:
Premier Trophy

Zimbabwe:
Logan Cup

Darts

Premier League

Football (soccer) 2010

National teams competitions
2011 FIFA Women's World Cup qualification (UEFA)
2011 UEFA European Under-21 Championship qualification

International clubs competitions
UEFA (Europe) Champions League
Europa League
UEFA Women's Champions League
Copa Libertadores (South America)

AFC (Asia) Champions League
AFC Cup
CAF (Africa) Champions League
CAF Confederation Cup
CONCACAF (North & Central America) Champions League
OFC (Oceania) Champions League
Domestic (national) competitions
Argentina
Australia

England
France
Germany
Iran
Italy
Japan
Norway
Russia
Scotland
Spain
Major League Soccer (USA & Canada)

Golf 2010

PGA Tour
European Tour
LPGA Tour
Champions Tour

Ice hockey 2010

National Hockey League

Motorcycle racing 2010

Superbike World championship

Rugby union 2010

2011 Rugby World Cup qualifying
Heineken Cup
European Challenge Cup
English Premiership
Celtic League

Top 14
Super 14
Sevens World Series

Days of the month

March 31, 2010 (Wednesday)

Basketball
ULEB Eurocup Quarterfinals, second leg: (first leg score in parentheses)
ALBA Berlin  72–59 (61–67)  Hapoel Jerusalem. ALBA Berlin win 133–126 on aggregate.
Power Elec Valencia  85–67 (71–64)  Aris BSA 2003. Valencia win 156–131 on aggregate.
Bizkaia Bilbao Basket  46–52 (59–47)  ČEZ Nymburk. Bilbao win 105–99 on aggregate.
Gran Canaria 2014  75–68 (70–81)  Panellinios BC. Panellinios win 149–145 on aggregate.
College Basketball Invitational Final, Game 2 in St. Louis:
Virginia Commonwealth 71, Saint Louis 65. Virginia Commonwealth wins series 2–0.
WNIT Semifinal in Ann Arbor, Michigan:
Miami (FL) 76, Michigan 59
McDonald's All-American Boys Game in Columbus, Ohio:
West 107, East 104
McDonald's All-American Girls Game in Columbus, Ohio:
West 84, East 75

Cricket
Australia in New Zealand:
2nd Test in Hamilton, Day 5:
 231 (74.3 overs) and 511/8d (153 overs);  264 (63.3 overs) and 302 (91.1 overs). Australia win by 176 runs, win 2–match series 2–0.

Football (soccer)
2011 FIFA Women's World Cup qualification (UEFA):
Group 1:
 0–3 
 0–4 
 4–0 
Standings: France 18 points (6 matches), Iceland 15 (6), Serbia 4 (5), Northern Ireland, Estonia 3 (4), Croatia 1 (5).
Group 4:
 2–0 
 1–4 
Standings: Poland 12 points (5 matches), Hungary 11 (5), Romania 7 (5), Ukraine 4 (3), Bosnia and Herzegovina 0 (6).
Group 6:  1–2 
Standings: Russia 12 points (4 matches), Switzerland 12 (5), Ireland 9 (6), Israel 3 (5), Kazakhstan 0 (4).
Group 7:
 1–1 
 7–0 
Standings: Italy 16 points (6 matches), Finland 13 (5), Portugal, Slovenia 6 (5), Armenia 0 (7).
Group 8:  0–4 
Standings: Sweden 12 points (4 matches), Belgium 7 (6), Czech Republic 6 (4), Wales 6 (6), Azerbaijan 4 (4).
UEFA Champions League Quarter-finals, first leg:
Arsenal  2–2  Barcelona
Internazionale  1–0  CSKA Moscow
Copa Libertadores: (teams in bold advance to the round of 16, teams in strike are eliminated)
Group 2: Monterrey  0–0  São Paulo
Standings: São Paulo 10 points (5 matches), Once Caldas 8 (4), Monterrey 6 (5), Nacional 0 (4).
Group 5: Internacional  2–0  Cerro
Standings: Internacional 8 points (4 matches), Cerro 7 (4), Deportivo Quito 4 (3), Emelec 0 (3).
Group 6: Morelia  1–1  Banfield
Standings: Nacional 8 points (4 matches), Banfield 8 (5), Morelia 5 (5), Deportivo Cuenca 3 (4).
Group 7: Cruzeiro  3–0  Vélez Sársfield
Standings: Cruzeiro 10 points (5 matches), Vélez Sársfield 10 (5), Colo-Colo 4 (4), Deportivo Italia 1 (4).
AFC Champions League group stage, Round 4: (teams in bold advance to the round of 16, teams in strike are eliminated)
Group A:
Al-Gharafa  1–1  Esteghlal
Al-Jazira  0–2  Al-Ahli
Standings (after 4 matches): Esteghlal 8 points, Al-Gharafa 7, Al-Ahli 6, Al-Jazira 1.
Group C:
Sepahan  2–0 Pakhtakor
Al-Shabab  3–2  Al-Ain
Standings (after 4 matches): Al-Shabab 7 points, Pakhtakor 6, Sepahan 5, Al-Ain 4.
Group E:
Beijing Guoan  0–1  Seongnam Ilhwa Chunma
Melbourne Victory  1–0  Kawasaki Frontale
Standings (after 4 matches): Seongnam Ilhwa Chunma 12 points, Beijing Guoan 6, Kawasaki Frontale, Melbourne Victory 3.
Group G:
Gamba Osaka  3–0  Singapore Armed Forces
Suwon Samsung Bluewings  2–0  Henan Construction
Standings (after 4 matches): Suwon Samsung Bluewings 10 points, Gamba Osaka 8, Henan Construction 2, Singapore Armed Forces 1.
CONCACAF Champions League Semifinals, first leg:
UNAM  1–0  Cruz Azul

March 30, 2010 (Tuesday)

Basketball
Euroleague Quarterfinals, game 3:
Real Madrid  73–84  Regal FC Barcelona. Barça lead series 2–1.
Partizan Belgrade  81–73  Maccabi Tel Aviv. Partizan Belgrade lead series 2–1.
Caja Laboral Baskonia  66–53  CSKA Moscow. CSKA Moscow lead series 2–1.
Asseco Prokom Gdynia  81–78  Olympiacos Piraeus. Olympiacos lead series 2–1.
NCAA Division I Women's Tournament:
Regional Finals (seeds in parentheses):
Dayton Regional:
(1) Connecticut 90, (3) Florida State 50
Kansas City Regional:
(3) Oklahoma 88, (4) Kentucky 68
NIT Semifinals in New York City:
Dayton 68, Mississippi 63
North Carolina 68, Rhode Island 67 (OT)
CollegeInsider.com Tournament Final in Springfield, Missouri:
Missouri State 78, Pacific 65

Cricket
Australia in New Zealand:
2nd Test in Hamilton, Day 4:
 231 (74.3 overs) and 511/8d (153 overs);  264 (63.3 overs) and 185/5 (62 overs). New Zealand require another 294 runs with 5 wickets remaining.

Football (soccer)
2011 FIFA Women's World Cup qualification (UEFA):
Group 2:  0–5 
Standings: Norway 12 points (4 matches),  7 (4), Belarus 4 (3),  3 (3),  0 (4)
UEFA Champions League Quarter-finals, first leg:
Lyon  3–1  Bordeaux
Bayern Munich  2–1  Manchester United
Copa Libertadores: (teams in bold advance to the round of 16, teams in strike are eliminated)
Group 3: Juan Aurich  0–2  Estudiantes
Standings: Estudiantes 10 points (5 matches),  Alianza Lima 9 (4), Juan Aurich 6 (5),  Bolívar 1 (4).
Group 4: Libertad  1–1  Lanús
Standings: Libertad 9 points (5 matches),  Universitario 8 (4), Lanús 7 (5),  Blooming 0 (4).
AFC Champions League group stage, Round 4: (teams in bold advance to the round of 16, teams in strike are eliminated)
Group B:
Bunyodkor  0–1  Zob Ahan
Al-Ittihad  4–0  Al-Wahda
Standings (after 4 matches): Zob Ahan 10 points, Al-Ittihad 7, Bunyodkor 6, Al-Wahda 0.
Group D:
Mes Kerman  3–1  Al-Sadd
Al-Ahli  2–3  Al-Hilal
Standings (after 4 matches): Al-Hilal 10 points, Al-Sadd, Mes Kerman 6, Al-Ahli 1.
Group F:
Persipura Jayapura  1–3  Kashima Antlers
Jeonbuk Hyundai Motors  1–0  Changchun Yatai
Standings (after 4 matches): Kashima Antlers 12 points, Jeonbuk Hyundai Motors 9, Changchun Yatai 3, Persipura Jayapura 0.
Group H:
Sanfrecce Hiroshima  1–0  Adelaide United
Shandong Luneng  1–2  Pohang Steelers
Standings (after 4 matches): Adelaide United, Pohang Steelers 9 points, Shandong Luneng, Sanfrecce Hiroshima 3.
CONCACAF Champions League Semifinals, first leg:
Toluca  1–1  Pachuca

March 29, 2010 (Monday)

Auto racing
NASCAR Sprint Cup Series:
Goody's Fast Pain Relief 500 in Ridgeway, Virginia:
(1)  Denny Hamlin (Toyota, Joe Gibbs Racing) (2)  Joey Logano (Toyota, Joe Gibbs Racing) (3)  Jeff Gordon (Chevrolet, Hendrick Motorsports)
Driver standings (after 6 of 36 rounds): (1)  Jimmie Johnson (Chevrolet, Hendrick Motorsports) 898 points (2)  Greg Biffle (Ford, Roush Fenway Racing) 884 (3)  Matt Kenseth (Ford, Roush Fenway Racing) 882.
IndyCar Series:
Honda Grand Prix of St. Petersburg in St. Petersburg, Florida:
(1) Will Power  (Team Penske) 2:07:05.7968 (2) Justin Wilson  (Dreyer & Reinbold Racing) +0.8244 (3) Ryan Briscoe  (Team Penske) +4.7290
Driver standings (after 2 of 17 rounds): (1) Power 103 points (2) Ryan Hunter-Reay  (Andretti Autosport), Wilson & Dario Franchitti  (Chip Ganassi Racing) 59.

Basketball
NCAA Division I Women's Tournament:
Regional Finals (seeds in parentheses):
Memphis Regional:
(4) Baylor 51, (2) Duke 48
Sacramento Regional:
(1) Stanford 55, (3) Xavier 53
College Basketball Invitational Final, Game 1 in Richmond, Virginia:
Virginia Commonwealth 68, Saint Louis 56. Virginia Commonwealth leads series 1–0.

Cricket
Australia in New Zealand:
2nd Test in Hamilton, Day 3:
 231 (74.3 overs) and 333/4 (114 overs; Simon Katich 106);  264 (63.3 overs). Australia lead by 300 runs with 6 wickets remaining.

Golf
PGA Tour:
Arnold Palmer Invitational in Orlando, Florida:
Winner: Ernie Els  277 (−11)
Els wins for the second time at Bay Hill; his second PGA Tour title of the season, and his eighteenth in total.

March 28, 2010 (Sunday)

Athletics
World Cross Country Championships in Bydgoszcz, Poland:
Senior men:  Joseph Ebuya  33:00  Teklemariam Medhin  33:06  Moses Ndiema Kipsiro  33:10
Senior women:  Emily Chebet  24:19  Linet Masai  24:20  Meselech Melkamu  24:26
Junior men:  Caleb Mwangangi Ndiku  22:07  Clement Kiprono Langat  22:09  Japhet Kipyegon Korir  22:12
Junior women:  Mercy Cherono  18:47  Purity Cherotich Rionoripo  18:54  Esther Chemtai  18:55

Auto racing
Formula One:
Australian Grand Prix in Melbourne, Australia:
(1) Jenson Button  (McLaren–Mercedes) 1:33:36.531 (2) Robert Kubica  (Renault) +12.034 (3) Felipe Massa  (Ferrari) +14.488
Drivers' Championship standings (after 2 of 19 rounds): (1) Fernando Alonso  (Ferrari) 37 points (2) Massa 33 (3) Button 31
Constructors' Championship standings: (1) Ferrari 70 (2) McLaren-Mercedes 54 (3) Mercedes 29
NASCAR Sprint Cup Series:
Goody's Fast Pain Relief 500 in Ridgeway, Virginia: Postponed to March 29 due to rain.
IndyCar Series:
Honda Grand Prix of St. Petersburg in St. Petersburg, Florida: Postponed to March 29 due to rain.
V8 Supercars:
BRC IMPCO V8 Supercars GP Challenge in Melbourne, Australia:
Race 3: (1) Garth Tander  (Holden Commodore) (2) Shane van Gisbergen  (Ford Falcon) (3) Will Davison  (Holden Commodore)

Basketball
NCAA Division I Men's Tournament:
Regional Finals (seeds in parentheses):
Midwest Regional in St. Louis:
(5) Michigan State 70, (6) Tennessee 69
South Regional in Houston:
(1) Duke 78, (3) Baylor 71
NCAA Division I Women's Tournament:
Regional semifinals (seeds in parentheses):
Dayton Regional:
(1) Connecticut 74, (4) Iowa State 36
(3) Florida State 74, (7) Mississippi State 71
Kansas City Regional:
(3) Oklahoma 77, (2) Notre Dame 72 (OT)
(4) Kentucky 76, (1) Nebraska 67
Women's Basketball Invitational Final in Boone, North Carolina:
Appalachian State 79, Memphis 71

Biathlon
World Championships in Khanty-Mansiysk, Russia:
Mixed relay:  Germany (Simone Hauswald, Magdalena Neuner, Simon Schempp, Arnd Peiffer) 1:18:17.4 (0 penalty loops + 6 extra bullets)  Norway (Ann Kristin Flatland, Tora Berger, Emil Hegle Svendsen, Ole Einar Bjørndalen) 1:19:41.4 (0 + 6)  Sweden (Helena Jonsson, Anna Carin Olofsson-Zidek, Björn Ferry, Carl Johan Bergman) 1:19:48.2 (0 + 11)

Cricket
Australia in New Zealand:
2nd Test in Hamilton, Day 2:
 231 (74.3 overs) and 35/0 (14 overs);  264 (63.3 overs; Ross Taylor 138). Australia lead by 2 runs with 10 wickets remaining.

Curling
World Women's Championship in Swift Current, Canada:
Bronze Medal Game:  Canada 9–6 Sweden
Gold Medal Game:  Germany 8–6  Scotland
German skip Andrea Schöpp and second Monika Wagner win their second world title after a break of 22 years.

Cycling
UCI ProTour:
Volta a Catalunya:
Stage 7:  Juan José Haedo  2h 32' 21"  Robert Förster  s.t.  Nicolas Roche  s.t.
Final General classification: (1) Joaquim Rodríguez   25h 16' 03" (2) Xavier Tondó  + 10" (3) Rein Taaramäe  + 43"
Gent–Wevelgem:  Bernhard Eisel  5h 16' 21"  Sep Vanmarcke  s.t.  Philippe Gilbert  s.t.
Track World Championships in Ballerup, Denmark:
Women's Points Race:  Tara Whitten  36 points  Lauren Ellis  33  Tatsiana Sharakova  33
Men's Omnium:  Edward Clancy  24 points  Leigh Howard  32  Taylor Phinney  33
Women's Keirin:  Simona Krupeckaitė   Victoria Pendleton   Olga Panarina 
Men's Sprint:  Grégory Baugé   Shane Perkins   Kévin Sireau

Football (soccer)
2011 FIFA Women's World Cup qualification (UEFA):
Group 6:  0–6 
Standings: Russia 12 points (4 matches),  9 (4),  9 (5),  3 (5), Kazakhstan 0 (4).
Group 8:  2–3 
Standings: Sweden 9 points (3 matches), Belgium 7 (6), Czech Republic 6 (4), Wales 6 (5), Azerbaijan 4 (4).
OFC Champions League Group stage, Matchday 6: (teams in bold advance to the final)
Group A: Auckland City FC  2–2  Waitakere United
Final standings: Waitakere United, Auckland City FC 12 points,  AS Magenta 6,  AS Manu-Ura 1.

Golf
PGA Tour:
Arnold Palmer Invitational in Orlando, Florida:
 Play suspended due to rain; final round will resume on March 29.
European Tour:
Open de Andalucia in Andalucia, Spain:
Winner: Louis Oosthuizen  263 (−17)
Oosthuizen claims his first European Tour title.
LPGA Tour:
Kia Classic Presented by J Golf in Carlsbad, California:
Winner: Hee Kyung Seo  276 (−12)
Seo, who entered the tournament on a sponsor's exemption, collects her first LPGA title.
Champions Tour:
Cap Cana Championship in Cap Cana, Dominican Republic:
Winner: Fred Couples  195 (−21)
Couples wins his third Champions Tour title in four career starts.

Motorcycle racing
Superbike:
Portimão Superbike World Championship round in Portimão, Portugal:
Race 1: (1) Max Biaggi  (Aprilia RSV4 1000) (2) Leon Haslam  (Suzuki GSX-R1000) (3) Jonathan Rea  (Honda CBR1000RR)
Race 2: (1) Biaggi (2) Haslam (3) Cal Crutchlow  (Yamaha YZF-R1)
Riders' standings (after 2 of 13 rounds): (1) Haslam 85 points (2) Biaggi 69 (3) Carlos Checa  (Ducati 1098R) 60.
Supersport:
Portimão Supersport World Championship round in Portimão, Portugal:
(1) Kenan Sofuoğlu  (Honda CBR600RR) (2) Joan Lascorz  (Kawasaki ZX-6R) (3) Michele Pirro  (Honda CBR600RR)
Riders' standings (after 2 of 13 rounds): (1) Sofuoğlu 41 points (2) Lascorz 40 (3) Eugene Laverty  (Honda CBR600RR) 30.

Rugby union
IRB Sevens World Series:
Hong Kong Sevens in Hong Kong:
Cup Final:  24–21 
Standings after 6 of 8 events: (1) Samoa 124 points (2) New Zealand 121 (3)  94

Short track speed skating
World Team Championships in Bormio, Italy:
Ladies:   45 points   35   21
Men:   38 points   36   24

March 27, 2010 (Saturday)

Auto racing
V8 Supercars:
BRC IMPCO V8 Supercars GP Challenge in Melbourne, Australia:
Race 2: (1) Garth Tander  (Holden Commodore) (2) Jamie Whincup  (Holden Commodore) (3) James Courtney  (Ford Falcon)

Basketball
NCAA Division I Men's Tournament:
Regional Finals (seeds in parentheses):
West Regional in Salt Lake City:
(5) Butler 63, (2) Kansas State 56
The Bulldogs advance to the Final Four in their home town for the first time in their history.
East Regional in Syracuse, New York:
(2) West Virginia 73, (1) Kentucky 66
The Mountaineers reach the Final Four for the first time since 1959.
NCAA Division I Women's Tournament:
Regional semifinals (seeds in parentheses):
Memphis Regional:
(4) Baylor 77, (1) Tennessee 62
(2) Duke 66, (11) San Diego State 58
Sacramento Regional:
(1) Stanford 73, (5) Georgia 36
(3) Xavier 74, (7) Gonzaga 56

Biathlon
World Cup 9 in Khanty-Mansiysk, Russia:
Women's mass start:  Magdalena Neuner  36:20.0 (3 penalty shots)  Sandrine Bailly  36:37.2 (1)  Anastasiya Kuzmina  36:43.6 (1)
Final Overall standings: (1) Neuner 933 points (2) Simone Hauswald  854 (3) Helena Jonsson  813
Final Mass start standings: (1) Neuner 216 points (2) Hauswald 198 (3) Andrea Henkel  169
Men's mass start:  Dominik Landertinger  38:19.8 (1 penalty shot)  Arnd Peiffer  38:23.4 (0)  Halvard Hanevold  38:31.0 (0)
Final Overall standings: (1) Emil Hegle Svendsen  828 points (2) Christoph Sumann  813 (3) Ivan Tcherezov  782
Final Mass start standings: (1) Evgeny Ustyugov  197 points (2) Svendsen 163 (3) Peiffer 161

Cricket
Australia in New Zealand:
2nd Test in Hamilton, Day 1:
 231 (74.3 overs);  19/1 (13 overs)

Curling
World Women's Championship in Swift Current, Canada:
Playoffs 3 vs. 4: Scotland 8–3 Sweden
Semifinal: Canada 4–10 Scotland

Cycling
UCI ProTour:
Volta a Catalunya:
Stage 6:  Samuel Dumoulin  4h 04' 45"  Rein Taaramäe  s.t.  Joaquim Rodríguez   s.t.
General classification: (1) Rodríguez  22h 43' 42" (2) Xavier Tondó  + 10" (3) Taaramäe + 43"
Track World Championships in Ballerup, Denmark:
Men's Madison:   (Leigh Howard, Cameron Meyer) 16 points   (Morgan Kneisky, Christophe Riblon) 6   (Ingmar De Poortere, Steve Schets) 5
Women's Sprint:  Victoria Pendleton   Guo Shuang   Simona Krupeckaitė 
Pendleton wins the title for the fourth straight time and fifth time overall.
Women's Omnium:  Tara Whitten  23 points  Elizabeth Armitstead  29  Leire Olaberria  30

Figure skating
World Championships in Turin, Italy:
Ladies:  Mao Asada  197.58  Kim Yuna  190.79  Laura Lepistö  178.62
Asada wins the title for the second time.

Football (soccer)
2011 FIFA Women's World Cup qualification (UEFA):
Group 1:
 0–3 
 6–0 
 0–2 
Standings: France 15 points (5 matches), Iceland 12 (5), Northern Ireland, Estonia 3 (3), Serbia, Croatia 1 (4).
Group 2:
 1–0 
 14–0 
Standings: Norway 9 points (3 matches), Netherlands 7 (4), Belarus 4 (2), Slovakia 3 (3), Macedonia 0 (4).
Group 3:
 1–3 
 9–0 
Standings: Denmark 10 points (4), Scotland 9 (3), Greece 6 (4), Bulgaria 4 (4), Georgia 0 (5).
Group 4:  0–5 
Standings: Poland 9 points (4 matches), Hungary 8 (4), Romania 7 (4), Ukraine 4 (3), Bosnia and Herzegovina 0 (5).
Group 5:  0–2 
Standings: Spain 12 points (4 matches), England 9 (3), Turkey 6 (4), Austria 3 (4), Malta 0 (5).
Group 6:  6–0 
Standings: Russia 9 points (3 matches), Switzerland 9 (4), Republic of Ireland 9 (5), Israel 3 (5), Kazakhstan 0 (3).
Group 7:
 1–3 
 1–0 
Standings: Italy 15 points (5 matches), Finland 12 (4), Slovenia 6 (5), Portugal 3 (4), Armenia 0 (6).
Group 8:  0–5 
Standings: Sweden 9 points (3 matches), Belgium 7 (5), Czech Republic 6 (4), Azerbaijan 4 (4), Wales 3 (4).
OFC Champions League Group stage, Matchday 6: (teams in bold advance to the final)
Group A:
AS Magenta  8–1  AS Manu-Ura
Standings:  Waitakere United,  Auckland City FC 11 points (5 matches), AS Magenta 6 (6), AS Manu-Ura 1 (6).
Group B:
Marist FC  1–4  PRK Hekari United
Tafea FC  1–3  Lautoka F.C.
Final standings: PRK Hekari United 13 points, Lautoka F.C. 12, Tafea FC 8, Marist FC 1.
 Coupe de la Ligue Final in Saint-Denis:
Marseille 3–1 Bordeaux
Marseille win the Cup for the first time, claiming their first trophy since the 1992–93 UEFA Champions League.

Horse racing
Dubai World Cup in Dubai, United Arab Emirates:  Gloria De Campeao  (trainer: Pascal Bary, jockey: Tiago Pereira)  Lizard's Desire  (trainer: Mike de Kock, jockey: Kevin Shea)  Allybar  (trainer: Mahmood Al Zarooni, jockey: Ahmad Ajtebi)

Mixed martial arts
UFC 111 in Newark, New Jersey:
Welterweight Championship bout: Georges St-Pierre  def. Dan Hardy  via unanimous decision (50–43, 50–44, 50–45) to retain the UFC Welterweight championship.
Interim Heavyweight Championship bout: Shane Carwin def.  Frank Mir  via KO (punches) at 3:48 of round 1 to become the UFC Interim Heavyweight champion.
Lightweight bout: Kurt Pellegrino  def. Fabricio Camões  via submission (rear naked choke) at 4:20 of round 2.
Welterweight bout: Jon Fitch  def. Ben Saunders  via unanimous decision (30–27, 30–27, 30–27).
Lightweight bout: Jim Miller  def. Mark Bocek  via unanimous decision (29–28, 29–28, 30–27).

Rugby union
2011 Rugby World Cup qualifying:
European Nations Cup First Division, matchday 6 (postponed from Feb 6):
 48–3  in Bucharest
Final standings:  27 points,  25, Romania 23,  21, Spain 14,  10.

March 26, 2010 (Friday)

Auto racing
V8 Supercars:
BRC IMPCO V8 Supercars GP Challenge in Melbourne, Australia:
Race 1: (1) James Courtney  (Ford Falcon) (2) Garth Tander  (Holden Commodore) (3) Shane van Gisbergen  (Ford Falcon)

Basketball
NCAA Division I Men's Tournament:
Regional semifinals (seeds in parentheses):
Midwest Regional in St. Louis:
(6) Tennessee 76, (2) Ohio State 73
(5) Michigan State 59, (9) Northern Iowa 52
South Regional in Houston:
(3) Baylor 72, (10) Saint Mary's 49
(1) Duke 70, (4) Purdue 57

Biathlon
World Cup 9 in Khanty-Mansiysk, Russia:
Men's sprint:  Ivan Tcherezov  24:24.3 (0 penalty shots)  Christian de Lorenzi  24:38.1 (0)  Andriy Deryzemlya  24:41.0 (1)
Overall standings after 24 of 25 events: (1) Emil Hegle Svendsen  801 points (2) Christoph Sumann  801 (3) Tcherezov 750
Final Sprint standings: (1) Svendsen 354 points (2) Tcherezov 344 (3) Sumann 292

Curling
World Women's Championship in Swift Current, Canada:
Tie-breaker: Sweden 11–8 United States
Playoffs 1 vs. 2: Canada 3–6 Germany

Cycling
UCI ProTour:
Volta a Catalunya:
Stage 5:  Davide Malacarne  4h 50' 03"  Andreas Klöden  + 36"  Luis León Sánchez  + 37"
General classification: (1) Joaquim Rodríguez   18h 38' 57" (2) Xavier Tondó  + 10" (3) Rein Taaramäe  + 46"
Track World Championships in Ballerup, Denmark:
Men's 1 km Time Trial:  Teun Mulder  1:00.341  Michaël D'Almeida  1:00.884  François Pervis  1:01.024
Men's Team Pursuit:   (Jack Bobridge, Rohan Dennis, Michael Hepburn, Cameron Meyer) 3:55.654   Great Britain (Steven Burke, Edward Clancy, Ben Swift, Andrew Tennant) 3:55.806   (Sam Bewley, Westley Gough, Peter Latham, Jesse Sergent) 3:59.475
Women's Scratch:  Pascale Jeuland   Yumari González Valdivieso   Belinda Goss

Figure skating
World Championships in Turin, Italy:
Ladies – Short program: (1) Mirai Nagasu  70.40 (2) Mao Asada  68.08 (3) Laura Lepistö  64.30
Ice dancing:  Tessa Virtue/Scott Moir  224.43  Meryl Davis/Charlie White  223.03  Federica Faiella/Massimo Scali  197.85
Virtue and Moir are the second ice dance world champions from Canada after Shae-Lynn Bourne and Victor Kraatz in 2003.

March 25, 2010 (Thursday)

Basketball
NCAA Division I Men's Tournament:
Regional semifinals (seeds in parentheses):
West Regional in Salt Lake City:
(5) Butler 63, (1) Syracuse 59
(2) Kansas State 101, (6) Xavier 96 (2 OT)
East Regional in Syracuse, New York:
(2) West Virginia 69, (11) Washington 56
(1) Kentucky 62, (12) Cornell 45
Euroleague Quarterfinals, game 2:
Regal FC Barcelona  63–70  Real Madrid. Series tied 1–1.
Maccabi Tel Aviv  98–78  Partizan Belgrade. Series tied 1–1.
CSKA Moscow  83–63  Caja Laboral Baskonia. CSKA lead series 2–0.
Olympiacos Piraeus  90–73  Asseco Prokom Gdynia. Olympiacos lead series 2–0.

Biathlon
World Cup 9 in Khanty-Mansiysk, Russia:
Women's sprint:  Yana Romanova  20:59.3 (0 penalty shots)  Marie-Laure Brunet  21:10.2 (0)  Helena Jonsson  21:14.8 (0)
Overall standings after 24 of 25 events: (1) Magdalena Neuner  873 points (2) Simone Hauswald  840 (3) Jonsson 792
Final Sprint standings: (1) Hauswald 345 points (2) Neuner 334 (3) Jonsson 332

Curling
World Women's Championship in Swift Current, Canada: (teams in bold advance to the playoffs, teams in italics go to tiebreaker, teams in strike are eliminated from playoffs contention)
Draw 15:
United States 5–9 Sweden
Latvia 6–9 Switzerland
Russia 4–7 Canada
Japan 6–5 Norway
Draw 16:
Germany 4–2 Latvia
China 5–9 United States
Denmark 8–7 Japan
Scotland 5–9 Russia
Draw 17:
Norway 7–9 Denmark
Canada 8–5 Scotland
Switzerland 2–8 Germany
Sweden 4–9 China
Final standings: Canada 10–1, Germany, Scotland 8–3, Sweden, USA 7–4, Denmark, China 6–5, Russia 5–6, Norway, Switzerland 3–8, Japan 2–9, Latvia 1–10.

Cycling
UCI ProTour:
Volta a Catalunya:
Stage 4:  Jens Voigt  4h 43' 28"  Rein Taaramäe  s.t.  Paul Voss  + 34"
General classification: (1) Joaquim Rodríguez   13h 48' 14" (2) Xavier Tondó  + 10" (3) Taaramäe + 46"
Track World Championships in Ballerup, Denmark:
Men's Scratch:  Alex Rasmussen   Juan Esteban Arango   Kazuhiro Mori 
Women's Team Sprint:   (Anna Meares, Kaarle McCulloch) 32.923 (WR)   (Gong Jinjie, Lin Junhong) 33.192   (Simona Krupeckaitė, Gintare Gaivenytė) 33.109
Men's Individual Pursuit:  Taylor Phinney  4:16.600  Jesse Sergent  4:18.459  Jack Bobridge  4:18.066
Women's Team Pursuit:   (Ashlee Ankudinoff, Sarah Kent, Josephine Tomic) 3:21.748   Great Britain (Wendy Houvenaghel, Elizabeth Armitstead, Joanna Rowsell) 3:22.287   (Rushlee Buchanan, Lauren Ellis, Alison Shanks) 3:21.552 (WR)
Men's Keirin:  Chris Hoy   Azizulhasni Awang   Maximilian Levy

Darts
Premier League round 7 in Birmingham, England:
Mervyn King  6–8 Simon Whitlock 
James Wade  8–5 Terry Jenkins 
Raymond van Barneveld  4–8 Ronnie Baxter 
Adrian Lewis  4–8 Phil Taylor 
High Checkout: Ronnie Baxter 164
Standings after 7 matches: Taylor 13 points, King, Baxter 8, Whitlock 7, Wade 6, Lewis, van Barneveld 5, Jenkins 4.

Figure skating
World Championships in Turin, Italy:
Ice dancing:
Standings after Original dance: (1) Tessa Virtue/Scott Moir  114.40 (2) Meryl Davis/Charlie White  112.54 (3) Federica Faiella/Massimo Scali  100.01
Men:  Daisuke Takahashi  257.70  Patrick Chan  247.22  Brian Joubert  241.74
Takahashi becomes the first Japanese winner of the men's event.

Football (soccer)
2011 FIFA Women's World Cup qualification (UEFA):
Group 5:  3–0 
Standings: Spain 12 points (4 matches), England 9 (3), Austria 3 (4), Turkey 0 (2), Malta 0 (3).
Copa Libertadores:
Group 1: Racing  1–0  Independiente Medellín
Standings:  Corinthians 7 points (3 matches), Racing 7 (4), Independiente Medellín 3 (4),  Cerro Porteño 1 (3).
Group 5: Deportivo Quito  1–0  Emelec
Standings (after 3 matches):  Cerro 7 points,  Internacional 5, Deportivo Quito 4, Emelec 0.
Group 7: Vélez Sársfield  2–1  Colo-Colo
Standings (after 4 matches): Vélez Sársfield 10 points,  Cruzeiro 7, Colo-Colo 4,  Deportivo Italia 1.

Snooker
Championship League in Essex, England:
Final: Marco Fu def. Mark Allen 3–2
Fu qualifies for the 2010 Premier League Snooker.

March 24, 2010 (Wednesday)

Basketball
ULEB Eurocup Quarterfinals, first leg:
Hapoel Jerusalem  67–61  ALBA Berlin
Aris BSA 2003  64–71  Power Elec Valencia
Panellinios BC  81–70  Gran Canaria 2014

Cricket
England in Bangladesh:
2nd Test in Mirpur, Day 5:
 419 (117.1 overs) and 285 (102 overs);  496 (173.3 overs) and 209/1 (44 overs; Alastair Cook 109*). England win by 9 wickets; win 2–match series 2–0.

Curling
World Women's Championship in Swift Current, Canada: (teams in bold advance to the playoffs, teams in strike are eliminated from playoffs contention)
Draw 12:
Japan 2–10 Canada
Russia 3–4 Norway
Latvia 4–7 Sweden
United States 9–7 Switzerland
Draw 13:
Switzerland 7–9 Scotland
Sweden 10–9 Denmark
Norway 7–8 China
Canada 7–8 Germany
Draw 14:
China 9–7 Russia
Germany 7–5 Japan
Scotland 7–4 United States
Denmark 13–1 Latvia
Standings after Draw 14: Canada, Scotland 8–1, USA, Germany, Sweden 6–3, China 5–4, Russia, Denmark 4–5, Norway 3–6, Switzerland 2–7, Japan, Latvia 1–8.

Cycling
UCI ProTour:
Volta a Catalunya:
Stage 3:  Xavier Tondó  4h 43' 23"  Joaquim Rodríguez  s.t.  Luis León Sánchez  + 48"
General classification: (1) Rodríguez  9h 04' 12" (2) Tondó + 10" (3) Sánchez + 48"
Track World Championships in Ballerup, Denmark:
Women's 500 m Time Trial:  Anna Meares  33.381  Simona Krupeckaitė  33.462  Olga Panarina  33.779
Men's Points Race:  Cameron Meyer  70  Peter Schep  33  Milan Kadlec  27
Women's Individual Pursuit:  Sarah Hammer  3:28.601  Wendy Houvenaghel  3:32.496  Vilija Sereikaitė  3:32.085
Men's Team Sprint:   (Robert Förstemann, Maximilian Levy, Stefan Nimke) 43.433   (Grégory Baugé, Michaël D'Almeida, Kévin Sireau) 43.453   Great Britain (Ross Edgar, Chris Hoy, Jason Kenny) 43.590

Figure skating
World Championships in Turin, Italy:
Men – Short program: (1) Daisuke Takahashi  89.30 (2) Patrick Chan  87.80 (3) Brian Joubert  87.70
Pairs:  Pang Qing/Tong Jian  211.39  Aliona Savchenko/Robin Szolkowy  204.74  Yuko Kavaguti/Alexander Smirnov  203.79
Pang and Tong win the title for the second time after a break of four years.

Football (soccer)
Copa Libertadores:
Group 4: Lanús  1–0  Blooming
Standings (after 4 matches):  Libertad,  Universitario 8 points, Lanús 6, Blooming 0.
Group 7: Cruzeiro  2–0  Deportivo Italia
Standings: Cruzeiro 7 points (4 matches),  Vélez Sársfield 7 (3),  Colo-Colo 4 (3), Deportivo Italia 1 (4).
Group 8: Universidad Católica  1–1  Caracas
Standings:  Universidad de Chile 7 points (3 matches),  Flamengo 6 (3), Universidad Católica 3 (4), Caracas 2 (4).
AFC Champions League group stage, Round 3:
Group B:
Zob Ahan  3–0  Bunyodkor
Al-Wahda  0–2  Al-Ittihad
Standings (after 3 matches): Zob Ahan 7 points, Bunyodkor 6, Al-Ittihad 4, Al-Wahda 0.
Group D:
Al-Sadd  4–1  Mes Kerman
Al-Hilal  1–1  Al-Ahli
Standings (after 3 matches): Al-Hilal 7 points, Al-Sadd 6, Mes Kerman 3, Al-Ahli 1.
Group F:
Changchun Yatai  1–2  Jeonbuk Hyundai Motors
Kashima Antlers  5–0  Persipura Jayapura
Standings (after 3 matches): Kashima Antlers 9 points, Jeonbuk Hyundai Motors 6, Changchun Yatai 3, Persipura Jayapura 0.
Group H:
Adelaide United  3–2  Sanfrecce Hiroshima
Pohang Steelers  1–0  Shandong Luneng
Standings (after 3 matches): Adelaide United 9 points, Pohang Steelers 6, Shandong Luneng 3, Sanfrecce Hiroshima 0.
AFC Cup group stage, Round 3:
Group B: Al-Hilal  1–2  Churchill Brothers
Standings (after 2 matches): Churchill Brothers 4 points,  Al-Kuwait 2, Al-Hilal 1.
Group D:
Kingfisher East Bengal  2–3  Al-Qadsia
Al-Ittihad  4–2  Al-Nejmeh
Standings (after 3 matches): Al-Ittihad 7 points, Al-Qadsia 5, Al-Nejmeh 4, Kingfisher East Bengal 0.
Group F:
Victory SC  2–1  Selangor
Sriwijaya  1–0  Bình Dương
Standings (after 3 matches): Sriwijaya 7 points, Bình Dương, Victory SC 4, Selangor 1.
Group H:
SHB Ðà Nẵng  3–0  NT Realty Wofoo Tai Po
Thai Port  2–2  Geylang United
Standings (after 3 matches): SHB Ðà Nẵng 9 points, Thai Port 4, Geylang United 2, NT Realty Wofoo Tai Po 1.

March 23, 2010 (Tuesday)

American football
 The NFL announces a change to its overtime rule for postseason play, effective next season. Under the new rule, the loser of the coin toss at the start of overtime will have an offensive possession if the winner of the toss scores a field goal on its first possession. (ESPN)

Basketball
NCAA Division I Women's Tournament:
Second Round (seeds in parentheses):
Dayton Regional in Norfolk, Virginia:
(1) Connecticut 90, (8) Temple 36
Sacramento Regional in Cincinnati:
(3) Xavier 63, (6) Vanderbilt 62
Dayton Regional in Pittsburgh:
(7) Mississippi State 85, (2) Ohio State 67
Kansas City Regional in Notre Dame, Indiana:
(2) Notre Dame 84, (10) Vermont 66
Kansas City Regional in Minneapolis:
(1) Nebraska 83, (8) UCLA 70
Memphis Regional in Austin, Texas:
(11) San Diego State 64, (3) West Virginia 55
Dayton Regional in Ames, Iowa:
(4) Iowa State 60, (12) Green Bay 56
Kansas City Regional in Norman, Oklahoma:
(3) Oklahoma 60, (11) UALR 44
Euroleague Quarterfinals, game 1:
Regal FC Barcelona  68–61  Real Madrid. Barça lead series 1–0.
Maccabi Tel Aviv  77–85  Partizan Belgrade. Partizan lead series 1–0.
CSKA Moscow  86–63  Caja Laboral Baskonia. CSKA lead series 1–0.
Olympiacos Piraeus  83–79  Asseco Prokom Gdynia. Olympiacos lead series 1–0.
ULEB Eurocup Quarterfinals, first leg:
ČEZ Nymburk  47–59  Bizkaia Bilbao Basket

Cricket
Australia in New Zealand:
1st Test in Wellington, Day 5:
 459/5d (131 overs) and 106/0 (23 overs);  157 (59.1 overs) and 407 (134.5 overs; Brendon McCullum 104). Australia win by 10 wickets; lead 2–match series 1–0.
England in Bangladesh:
2nd Test in Mirpur, Day 4:
 419 (117.1 overs) and 172/6 (68 overs);  496 (173.3 overs). Bangladesh lead by 95 runs with 4 wickets remaining.

Curling
World Women's Championship in Swift Current, Canada:
Draw 9:
Sweden 2–9 Germany
Switzerland 5–6 China
Canada 9–6 Denmark
Norway 3–7 Scotland
Draw 10:
Denmark 5–6 United States
Scotland 10–1 Latvia
Germany 4–7 Russia
China 11–6 Japan
Draw 11:
Norway 11–2 Latvia
United States 4–6 Canada
Japan 4–7 Switzerland
Russia 3–10 Sweden
Standings after Draw 11: Canada 7–0, Scotland 6–1, United States 5–2, Russia, Germany, Sweden 4–3, Denmark, China 3–4, Norway, Switzerland 2–5, Japan, Latvia 1–6.

Cycling
UCI ProTour:
Volta a Catalunya:
Stage 2:  Mark Cavendish  4h 15' 46"  Juan José Haedo  s.t.  Aitor Galdós  s.t.
General classification: (1) Paul Voss   4h 20' 43" (2) Levi Leipheimer  + 1" (3) Andreas Klöden  + 2"

Figure skating
World Championships in Turin, Italy:
Ice dance – Compulsory dance: (1) Tessa Virtue/Scott Moir  44.13 (2) Meryl Davis/Charlie White  43.25 (3) Federica Faiella/Massimo Scali  40.85
Pairs – Short program: (1) Pang Qing/Tong Jian  75.28 (2) Yuko Kavaguti/Alexander Smirnov  73.12 (3) Aliona Savchenko/Robin Szolkowy  69.52

Football (soccer)
Copa Libertadores:
Group 3: Estudiantes  2–0  Bolívar
Standings (after 4 matches):  Alianza Lima 9 points, Estudiantes 7,  Juan Aurich 6, Bolívar 1.
Group 4: Libertad  1–1  Universitario
Standings: Libertad, Universitario 8 points (4 matches),  Lanús 3 (3),  Blooming 0 (3).
AFC Champions League group stage, Round 3:
Group A:
Esteghlal  3–0  Al-Gharafa
Al-Ahli  5–1  Al-Jazira
Standings (after 3 matches): Esteghlal 7 points, Al-Gharafa 6, Al-Ahli 3, Al-Jazira 1.
Group C:
Pakhtakor  2–1  Sepahan
Al-Ain  2–1  Al-Shabab
Standings (after 3 matches): Pakhtakor 6 points, Al-Ain, Al-Shabab 4, Sepahan 2.
Group E:
Seongnam Ilhwa Chunma  3–1  Beijing Guoan
Kawasaki Frontale  4–0  Melbourne Victory
Standings (after 3 matches): Seongnam Ilhwa Chunma 9 points, Beijing Guoan 6, Kawasaki Frontale 3, Melbourne Victory 0.
Group G:
Singapore Armed Forces  2–4  Gamba Osaka
Henan Construction  0–2  Suwon Samsung Bluewings
Standings (after 3 matches): Suwon Samsung Bluewings 7 points, Gamba Osaka 5, Henan Construction 2, Singapore Armed Forces 1.
AFC Cup group stage, Round 3:
Group A:
Al-Karamah  2–0  Al-Ahli
Saham  0–0  Shabab Al-Ordon
Standings (after 3 matches): Al-Karamah 7 points, Shabab Al-Ordon 5, Saham 4, Al-Ahli 0.
Group C:
Nasaf Qarshi  1–2  Kazma
Al-Ahed  1–1  Al-Jaish
Standings (after 3 matches): Kazma 9 points, Nasaf Qarshi 6, Al-Jaish, Al-Ahed 1.
Group E:
Al-Wihdat  2–0  Al-Nahda
Al-Rayyan  0–2  Al-Riffa
Standings (after 3 matches): Al-Riffa 9 points, Al-Rayyan 6, Al-Wihdat 3, Al-Nahda 0.
Group G:
Muangthong United  3–1  VB Sports Club
South China  6–3  Persiwa Wamena
Standings: VB Sports Club 6 points (3 matches), South China 4 (3), Muangthong United 4 (2), Persiwa Wamena 0 (2).

March 22, 2010 (Monday)

Basketball
NCAA Division I Women's Tournament:
Second Round (seeds in parentheses):
Memphis Regional in Knoxville, Tennessee:
(1) Tennessee 92, (8) Dayton 64
Memphis Regional in Durham, North Carolina:
(2) Duke 60, (7) LSU 52
Dayton Regional in Tallahassee, Florida:
(3) Florida State 66, (6) St. John's 65 (OT)
Kansas City Regional in Louisville, Kentucky:
(4) Kentucky 70, (5) Michigan State 52
Sacramento Regional in Stanford, California:
(1) Stanford 96, (8) Iowa 67
Sacramento Regional in Seattle:
(7) Gonzaga 72, (2) Texas A&M 71
Sacramento Regional in Tempe, Arizona:
(5) Georgia 74, (4) Oklahoma State 71 (OT)
Memphis Regional in Berkeley, California:
(4) Baylor 49, (5) Georgetown 33
Baylor's Brittney Griner blocks a tournament-record 14 shots—two more than the Hoyas make in the game.

Cricket
Australia in New Zealand:
1st Test in Wellington, Day 4:
 459/5d (131 overs);  157 (59.1 overs) and 369/6 (124 overs). New Zealand lead by 67 runs with 4 wickets remaining.
England in Bangladesh:
2nd Test in Mirpur, Day 3:
 419 (117.1 overs);  440/8 (154 overs; Ian Bell 138).

Curling
World Women's Championship in Swift Current, Canada:
Draw 6:
Scotland 11–2 Japan
Denmark 4–10 Russia
China 8–2 Latvia
Germany 8–12 United States
Draw 7:
Russia 6–7 Switzerland
Japan 5–8 Sweden
United States 8–7 Norway
Latvia 6–12 Canada
Draw 8:
Canada 10–9 China
Norway 4–10 Germany
Sweden 3–7 Scotland
Switzerland 3–8 Denmark
Standings after Draw 8: Canada 5–0, Scotland, United States 4–1, Russia, Sweden, Denmark, Germany 3–2, China, Japan, Norway, Switzerland, Latvia 1–4.

Cycling
UCI ProTour:
Volta a Catalunya:
Stage 1 (ITT):  Paul Voss   4' 57"  Levi Leipheimer  + 1"  Andreas Klöden  + 2"

March 21, 2010 (Sunday)

Auto racing
NASCAR Sprint Cup Series:
Food City 500 in Bristol, Tennessee:
(1)  Jimmie Johnson (Chevrolet, Hendrick Motorsports) (2)  Tony Stewart (Chevrolet, Stewart Haas Racing) (3)  Kurt Busch (Dodge, Penske Racing)
Driver standings after 5 of 36 races: (1)  Kevin Harvick (Chevrolet, Richard Childress Racing) 774 points (2)  Matt Kenseth (Ford, Roush Fenway Racing) 773 (3) Johnson 760.

Basketball
NCAA Division I Men's Tournament:
Second Round (seeds in parentheses):
West Regional in Buffalo, New York:
(1) Syracuse 87, (8) Gonzaga 65
Midwest Regional in Milwaukee:
(2) Ohio State 75, (10) Georgia Tech 66
Midwest Regional in Spokane, Washington:
(5) Michigan State 85, (4) Maryland 83
East Regional in Buffalo, New York:
(2) West Virginia 68, (10) Missouri 59
East Regional in Jacksonville, Florida:
(12) Cornell 87, (4) Wisconsin 69
West Regional in Milwaukee:
(6) Xavier 71, (3) Pittsburgh 68
South Regional in Spokane, Washington:
(4) Purdue 63, (5) Texas A&M 61 (OT)
South Regional in Jacksonville, Florida:
(1) Duke 68, (8) California 53
NCAA Division I Women's Tournament:
First round (seeds in parentheses):
Dayton Regional in Pittsburgh:
(2) Ohio State 93, (15) Saint Francis 59
(7) Mississippi State 68, (10) Middle Tennessee 64
Sacramento Regional in Cincinnati:
(6) Vanderbilt 83, (11) DePaul 76 (OT)
(3) Xavier 94, (14) East Tennessee State 82
Dayton Regional in Norfolk, Virginia:
(1) Connecticut 95, (16) Southern 39
(8) Temple 65, (9) James Madison 53
Kansas City Regional in Notre Dame, Indiana:
(10) Vermont 64, (7) Wisconsin 55
(2) Notre Dame 86, (15) Cleveland State 58
Kansas City Regional in Minneapolis:
(1) Nebraska 83, (16) Northern Iowa 44
(8) UCLA 74, (9) North Carolina State 54
Memphis Regional in Austin, Texas:
(11) San Diego State 74, (6) Texas 63
(3) West Virginia 58 (14) Lamar 43
Kansas City Regional in Norman, Oklahoma:
(11) UALR 63, (6) Georgia Tech 53
(3) Oklahoma 68, (14) South Dakota State 57
Dayton Regional in Ames, Iowa:
(12) Green Bay 69, (5) Virginia 67
(4) Iowa State 79, (13) Lehigh 42

Biathlon
World Cup 8 in Holmenkollen, Norway:
Women's mass start:  Simone Hauswald  37:00.7 (2 penalty shots)  Vita Semerenko  37:15.4 (0)  Magdalena Neuner  37:22.9 (3)
Overall standings after 23 of 25 events: (1) Neuner 839 points (2) Hauswald 797 (3) Helena Jonsson  744
Mass start standings after 5 of 6 events: (1) Hauswald 198 points (2) Andrea Henkel  169 (3) Jonsson 158
Men's mass start:  Ivan Tcherezov  40:10.1 (0 penalty shots) Christoph Sumann  40:36.4 (3)  Emil Hegle Svendsen  40:44.7 (2)
Overall standings after 23 of 25 events: (1) Svendsen 767 points (2) Sumann 758 (3) Evgeny Ustyugov  715
Mass start standings after 5 of 6 events: (1) Ustyugov 197 points (2) Sumann 160 (3) Svendsen 154

Cricket
Australia in New Zealand:
1st Test in Wellington, Day 3:
 459/5d (131 overs);  157 (59.1 overs) and 187/5 (72 overs). Following on, New Zealand trail by 115 runs with 5 wickets remaining.
England in Bangladesh:
2nd Test in Mirpur, Day 2:
 419 (117.1 overs);  171/3 (64 overs).

Cross-country skiing
World Cup Final:
Stage 4 in Falun, Sweden:
Women's 10 km Freestyle Handicap:  Marit Bjørgen   Justyna Kowalczyk   Charlotte Kalla 
Women's 25 km Mass Start:  Bjørgen  Kowalczyk  Kalla
Final Overall standings: (1) Kowalczyk 2064 points (2) Bjørgen 1320 (3) Petra Majdič  1191
Men's 15 km Freestyle Handicap:  Petter Northug   Maurice Manificat   Marcus Hellner 
Men's 40 km Mass Start:  Northug  Manificat  Hellner
Final Overall standings: (1) Northug 1621 points (2) Lukáš Bauer  1021 (3) Hellner 985

Curling
World Women's Championship in Swift Current, Canada:
Draw 3:
Denmark 8–3 China
Scotland 6–9 Germany
Draw 4:
Sweden 9–5 Norway
United States 6–7 Latvia
Russia 7–6 Japan
Canada 6–4 Switzerland
Draw 5:
Germany 3–10 Denmark
Norway 3–8 Canada
Switzerland 6–7 Sweden
China 4–14 Scotland
Standings after Draw 5: Canada 3–0, United States, Germany, Denmark, Sweden, Scotland, Russia 2–1, Japan, Norway, Latvia 1–2, China, Switzerland 0–3.

Football (soccer)
2011 FIFA Women's World Cup qualification (UEFA):
Group 6:  0–3 
Standings:  9 points (3 matches), Republic of Ireland 9 (5),  6 (3), Israel 3 (4),  0 (3).
CAF Champions League qualification First round, first leg:
Saint Eloi Lupopo  0–1  Dynamos
Gazelle FC  1–1  Al-Merreikh
Africa Sports  0–0  Al-Hilal Omdurman
Union Douala  0–2  ES Sétif
Djoliba  1–0  ASC Linguère
Raja Casablanca  1–1  Atlético Petróleos Luanda
CAF Confederation Cup First round, first leg:
Banks  1–1  Haras El Hodood
Panthère de Ndé  1–1  AS Vita Club
AC Léopard  3–1  Cotonsport
Amal  4–2  Costa do Sol
Petrojet  3–0  Khartoum
ASFAN  1–0  Étoile Sahel
Baraka  0–0  FUS Rabat
CAPS United  1–1  Moroka Swallows
Warri Wolves  3–0  ZESCO United
 Scottish League Cup Final in Glasgow:
St Mirren 0–1 Rangers
Rangers win the trophy for the 26th time, despite having two players sent off.

Golf
PGA Tour:
Transitions Championship in Palm Harbor, Florida:
Winner: Jim Furyk  271 (−13)
Furyk wins his 14th PGA Tour title.
European Tour:
Hassan II Golf Trophy in Rabat, Morocco:
Winner: Rhys Davies  266 (−25)
Davies wins his first European Tour title.

Rugby union
IRB Sevens World Series:
Australia Sevens in Adelaide:
Cup:  38–10 
 The USA advance to a Cup final for the first time ever.
Plate:  21–14 
Bowl:  33–12 
Shield:  19–22 
Standings after 5 of 8 events: (1) New Zealand 96 points (2) Samoa 94 (3)  74
LV= Cup Final in Worcester, England:
 Northampton Saints  30–24  Gloucester

Short track speed skating
World Championships in Sofia, Bulgaria:
Ladies:
1000 metres:  Wang Meng  1:31.603  Cho Ha-ri  +0.092  Katherine Reutter  +0.144
3000 metres:  Park Seung-hi  5:04.070  Cho +0.118  Lee Eun-byul  +0.192
Final standings:  Park 73 points  Wang 68  Cho 55.
Relay:   (Cho, Park, Lee, Kim Min-jung) 4:08.356   (Marianne St-Gelais, Jessica Gregg, Kalyna Roberge, Tania Vicent) +0.954   (Reutter, Alyson Dudek, Kimberly Derrick, Lana Gehring) +5.875
Men:
1000 metres:  Lee Ho-suk  1:34.198  Kwak Yoon-gy  +0.033  J. R. Celski  +0.092
3000 metres:  Lee  Kwak  Celski
Final standings:  Lee 86 points  Kwak 76  Liang Wenhao  47.
Relay:   (Lee Ho-suk, Kwak, Lee Jung-su, Kim Seoung-il) 6:44.821   (Celski, Jordan Malone, Travis Jayner, Simon Cho) +2.510   (Paul Herrmann, Tyson Heung, Sebastian Praus, Robert Seifert) +3.467

Ski jumping
Ski-Flying World Championships in Planica, Slovenia:
HS 215 Team:  Austria (Gregor Schlierenzauer, Martin Koch, Thomas Morgenstern, Wolfgang Loitzl) 1641.4 points  Norway (Bjørn Einar Romøren, Johan Remen Evensen, Anders Bardal, Anders Jacobsen) 1542.3  Finland (Harri Olli, Matti Hautamäki, Olli Muotka, Janne Happonen) 1474.3

Snowboarding
World Cup in La Molina, Spain:
Men's parallel giant slalom:  Jasey Jay Anderson   Matthew Morison   Andreas Prommegger 
Final standings: (1) Benjamin Karl  7050 points (2) Prommegger 5410 (3) Anderson 5250
Women's parallel giant slalom:  Ekaterina Tudegesheva   Doris Guenther   Ina Meschik 
Final standings: (1) Nicolien Sauerbreij  5200 points (2) Guenther 5110 (3) Fraenzi Maegert-Kohli  4090

Speed skating
World Allround Championships in Heerenveen, Netherlands:
Women:  Martina Sáblíková  161.022  Kristina Groves  161.512  Ireen Wüst  162.106
Sáblíková wins the title for the second straight time.
Men:  Sven Kramer  148.921  Jonathan Kuck  149.558  Håvard Bøkko  150.227
Kramer wins the title for the fourth straight time.

Tennis
ATP World Tour:
BNP Paribas Open in Indian Wells, United States:
Final: Ivan Ljubičić  def. Andy Roddick  7–6(3), 7–6(5)
Ljubičić wins his 10th career title and his first Masters 1000 title.
WTA Tour:
BNP Paribas Open in Indian Wells, United States:
Final: Jelena Janković  def. Caroline Wozniacki  6–2, 6–4
Janković wins her 12th career title.

March 20, 2010 (Saturday)

Auto racing
American Le Mans Series:
12 Hours of Sebring in Sebring, Florida:
(1)  #07 Team Peugeot Total (Anthony Davidson , Marc Gené , Alexander Wurz ) (2)  #08 Team Peugeot Total (Sébastien Bourdais , Pedro Lamy , Nicolas Minassian ) (3)  #007 Aston Martin Racing (Adrian Fernández , Stefan Mücke , Harold Primat )
Nationwide Series:
Scotts Turf Builder 300 in Bristol, Tennessee:
(1)  Justin Allgaier (Dodge, Penske Racing) (2)  Brad Keselowski (Dodge, Penske Racing) (3)  Kyle Busch (Toyota, Joe Gibbs Racing)
Driver standings (after 4 of 35 races): (1)  Carl Edwards (Ford, Roush Fenway Racing) 670 points (2) Keselowski 644 (3) Allgaier 639

Basketball
NCAA Division I Men's Tournament:
Second Round (seeds in parentheses):
South Regional in Providence, Rhode Island:
(10) Saint Mary's 75, (2) Villanova 68
West Regional in San Jose, California:
(5) Butler 54, (13) Murray State 52
Midwest Regional in Providence, Rhode Island:
(6) Tennessee 83, (14) Ohio 68
Midwest Regional in Oklahoma City:
(9) Northern Iowa 69, (1) Kansas 67
East Regional in San Jose, California:
(11) Washington 82, (3) New Mexico 64
South Regional in New Orleans:
(3) Baylor 76, (11) Old Dominion 68
West Regional in Oklahoma City:
(2) Kansas State 84, (7) BYU 72
East Regional in New Orleans:
(1) Kentucky 90, (9) Wake Forest 60
NCAA Division I Women's Tournament:
First round (seeds in parentheses):
Memphis Regional in Durham, North Carolina:
(7) LSU 60, (10) Hartford 39
(2) Duke 72, (15) Hampton 37
Kansas City Regional in Louisville, Kentucky:
(5) Michigan State 72, (12) Bowling Green 62
(4) Kentucky 83, (13) Liberty 77
Memphis Regional in Knoxville, Tennessee:
(1) Tennessee 75, (16) Austin Peay 42
(8) Dayton 67, (9) TCU 66
Dayton Regional in Tallahassee, Florida:
(6) St. John's 65, (11) Princeton 47
(3) Florida State 75, (14) Louisiana Tech 61
Sacramento Regional in Seattle:
(2) Texas A&M 84, (15) Portland State 53
(7) Gonzaga 82, (10) North Carolina 76
Sacramento Regional in Tempe, Arizona:
(4) Oklahoma State 70, (13) Chattanooga 63
(5) Georgia 64 (12) Tulane 59
Sacramento Regional in Stanford, California:
(8) Iowa 70, (9) Rutgers 63
(1) Stanford 79, (16) UC Riverside 47
Memphis Regional in Berkeley, California:
(5) Georgetown 62, (12) Marist 42
(4) Baylor 69, (13) Fresno State 55

Biathlon
World Cup 8 in Holmenkollen, Norway:
Women's pursuit:  Simone Hauswald  32:05.5 (3 penalty shots)  Darya Domracheva  32:10.9 (1)  Anna Carin Olofsson-Zidek  32:45.3 (2)
Overall standings after 22 of 25 events: (1) Magdalena Neuner  791 points (2) Hauswald 737 (3) Helena Jonsson  731
Final Pursuit standings: (1) Neuner 256 points (2) Hauswald 217 (3) Olga Zaitseva  207
Men's pursuit:  Martin Fourcade  33:46.9 (3 penalty shots)  Simon Schempp  33:55.9 (0)  Ivan Tcherezov  34:13.1 (1)
Overall standings after 22 of 25 events: (1) Emil Hegle Svendsen  719 points (2) Christoph Sumann  704 (3) Evgeny Ustyugov  675
Final Pursuit standings: (1) Fourcade 197 points (2) Simon Eder  196 (3) Tcherezov 189

Cricket
Australia in New Zealand:
1st Test in Wellington, Day 2:
 459/5d (131 overs; Michael Clarke 168, Marcus North 112*);  108/4 (47 overs).
England in Bangladesh:
2nd Test in Mirpur, Day 1:
 330/8 (94 overs); .

Cross-country skiing
World Cup Final:
Stage 3 in Falun, Sweden:
Women's Pursuit:  Marit Bjørgen   Kristin Størmer Steira   Therese Johaug 
Overall standings: (1) Justyna Kowalczyk  1904 points (2) Petra Majdič  1191 (3) Bjørgen 1120
Distance standings: (1) Kowalczyk 929 points (2) Bjørgen 636 (3) Størmer Steira 568
Men's Pursuit:  Petter Northug   Tobias Angerer   Lukáš Bauer 
Overall standings: (1) Northug 1421 points (2) Bauer 963 (3) Marcus Hellner  865
Distance standings: (1) Northug 749 points (2) Bauer 563 (3) Hellner 483

Curling
World Women's Championship in Swift Current, Canada:
Draw 1:
China 6–8 Germany
Russia 6–8 United States
Japan 7–4 Latvia
Scotland 9–4 Denmark
Draw 2:
Latvia 2–4 Russia
Canada 9–6 Sweden
Norway 7–6 Switzerland
Japan 3–10 United States

Cycling
Milan–San Remo:  Óscar Freire  6h 57' 28"  Tom Boonen  s.t.  Alessandro Petacchi  s.t.

Football (soccer)
CAF Champions League qualification First round, first leg:
Curepipe Starlight  0–3  Gaborone United
Supersport United  3–0  Ferroviário Maputo
Zanaco  1–0  ASEC Mimosas
APR  1–0  TP Mazembe
Tiko United  2–2  Heartland
Gunners  1–0  Al-Ahly
Espérance ST  4–1  ASFA Yennega
Ismaily  3–1  US Stade Tamponnaise
CAF Confederation Cup First round, first leg:
CR Belouizdad  1–0  FAR Rabat
Séwé Sport 2–0  Stade Malien
DC Motema Pembe  0–0  FC 105
Académica Petróleo  2–0  Enyimba
CO Bamako  0–0  Primeiro de Agosto
Ahly Tripoli  0–0  CS Sfaxien
 A-League Grand Final in Melbourne:
Melbourne Victory 1–1 (2–4 pen.) Sydney FC
Sydney FC win the title for the second time.

Freestyle skiing
World Cup in Sierra Nevada, Spain:
Men's skicross:  Michael Schmid   Audun Grønvold   Andreas Steffen 
Final Standings: (1) Schmid 815 points (2) Christopher Del Bosco  547 (3) Grønvold 530
Women's skicross:  Anna Holmlund   Ophélie David   Marte Høie Gjefsen 
Final Standings: (1) David 735 points (2) Ashleigh McIvor  608 (3) Holmlund 522

Rugby union
Six Nations Championship, week 5:
 33–10  in Cardiff
 20–23  in Dublin
With this result, France win their fifth Six Nations Championship.
 12–10  in Paris
France complete their ninth Grand Slam and the first since 2004.
Final standings: France 10 points, Ireland 6, England 5, Wales 4, Scotland 3, Italy 2.
2011 Rugby World Cup qualifying:
European Nations Cup First Division, matchday 10:
 9–20  in Lisbon
Romania secure third place in the competition and advance to the European qualification playoffs for a spot in the final place playoff.
 36–8  in Trabzon, Turkey
In a contest between teams already qualified for the World Cup, Georgia's win gives them the ENC title for the second straight time and third overall.
 17–21  in Heidelberg
Germany are relegated to European Nations Cup Division 2A.
Standings (10 games unless stated otherwise): Georgia 27 points, Russia 25, Portugal 21, Romania 20 (9), Spain 13 (9), Germany 10.

Short track speed skating
World Championships in Sofia, Bulgaria:
Ladies 500 metres:  Wang Meng  43.619  Kalyna Roberge  +0.060  Marianne St-Gelais  +0.128
Overall standings: (1) Park Seung-hi  and Wang 34 points (3) Roberge 26
Men 500 metres:  Liang Wenhao  41.383  François Hamelin  +0.073  François-Louis Tremblay  +0.143
Overall standings: (1) Liang and Kwak Yoon-gy  (3) Hamelin and Sung Si-bak  21.

Snowboarding
World Cup in La Molina, Spain:
Men's half-pipe:  Fredrik Austbø   Christophe Schmidt   Justin Lamoureux 
Overall standings after 28 of 29 events: (1) Benjamin Karl  6600 points (2) Pierre Vaultier  5800 (3) Andreas Prommegger  4810
Final Halfpipe standings: (1) Lamoureux 2400 points (2) Janne Korpi  1730 (3) Schmidt 1690
Women's half-pipe:  Holly Crawford   Mercedes Nicoll   Paulina Ligocka 
Overall standings after 23 of 24 events: (1) Maëlle Ricker  5290 points (2) Nicolien Sauerbreij  4800 (3) Helene Olafsen  4710
Final Halfpipe standings: (1) Cai Xuetong  3040 points (2) Sun Zhifeng  2805 (3) Crawford 2600

Ski jumping
Ski-Flying World Championships in Planica, Slovenia:
 Simon Ammann  935.8 points  Gregor Schlierenzauer  910.3  Anders Jacobsen  894.0

March 19, 2010 (Friday)

Basketball
NCAA Division I Men's Tournament:
First round (seeds in parentheses):
East Regional in Buffalo, New York:
(2) West Virginia 77, (15) Morgan State 50
(10) Missouri 86, (7) Clemson 78
East Regional in Jacksonville, Florida:
(12) Cornell 78, (5) Temple 65
(4) Wisconsin 53, (13) Wofford 49
West Regional in Milwaukee:
(6) Xavier 65, (11) Minnesota 54
(3) Pittsburgh 89, (14) Oakland 66
South Regional in Spokane, Washington:
(4) Purdue 72, (13) Siena 64
(5) Texas A&M 69, (12) Utah State 53
West Regional in Buffalo, New York:
(8) Gonzaga 67, (9) Florida State 60
(1) Syracuse 79, (16) Vermont 56
South Regional in Jacksonville, Florida:
(1) Duke 73, (16) Arkansas–Pine Bluff 44
(8) California 77, (9) Louisville 62
Midwest Regional in Milwaukee:
(10) Georgia Tech 64, (7) Oklahoma State 59
(2) Ohio State 68, (15) UC Santa Barbara 51
Midwest Regional in Spokane, Washington:
(5) Michigan State 70, (12) New Mexico State 67
(4) Maryland 89, (13) Houston 77
 Russian Cup Final:
UNICS Kazan 74–80 CSKA Moscow
CSKA Moscow win the Cup for the fourth time.
 NBA news: In the Cleveland Cavaliers' 92–85 win over the Chicago Bulls, LeBron James becomes the youngest player in NBA history to amass 15,000 career points. (AP via ESPN)

Cricket
Australia in New Zealand:
1st Test in Wellington, Day 1:
 316/4 (90 overs; Michael Clarke 100*); .

Cross-country skiing
World Cup Final:
Stage 2 in Falun, Sweden:
Women's 2.5 km Classic:  Justyna Kowalczyk   Marit Bjørgen   Charlotte Kalla 
Overall standings: (1) Kowalczyk 1882 points (2) Petra Majdič  1191 (3) Bjørgen 1070
Distance standings: (1) Kowalczyk 907 points (2) Bjørgen 586 (3) Kristin Størmer Steira  522
Men's 3.3 km Classic:  Dario Cologna   Mats Larsson   Maxim Vylegzhanin 
Overall standings: (1) Petter Northug  1371 points (2) Lukáš Bauer  920 (3) Marcus Hellner  825
Distance standings: (1) Northug 699 points (2) Bauer 520 (3) Hellner 443

Football (soccer)
CAF Champions League qualification First round, first leg:
Club Africain  1–1  JS Kabylie
Ittihad  1–1  Difaa El Jadida
CAF Confederation Cup First round, first leg:
CAPS United  –  Moroka Swallows postponed to March 21.
Lengthens  0–3  Simba

Short track speed skating
World Championships in Sofia, Bulgaria:
Ladies 1500 metres:  Park Seung-hi  2:21.570  Lee Eun-byul  +0.095  Cho Ha-ri  +0.251
Men 1500 metres:  Kwak Yoon-gy  2:24.316  Sung Si-bak  +0.057  Lee Ho-suk  +0.143

Ski jumping
Ski-Flying World Championships in Planica, Slovenia:
Standings after two rounds: (1) Simon Ammann  445.6 points (215.5m/216.5m) (2) Adam Małysz  442.8 (217.5/215.0) (3) Gregor Schlierenzauer  428.4 (209.5/205.0)

Snowboarding
World Cup in La Molina, Spain:
Men's snowboard cross:  Pierre Vaultier   Alex Pullin   Pat Holland 
Overall standings after 27 of 29 events: (1) Benjamin Karl  6600 points (2) Vaultier 5120 (3) Andreas Prommegger  4810
Final Snowboard cross standings: (1) Vaultier 5120 points (2) Pullin 2610 (3) Graham Watanabe  2570
Women's snowboard cross:  Helene Olafsen   Simona Meiler   Maëlle Ricker 
Overall standings after 22 of 24 events: (1) Nicolien Sauerbreij  4800 points (2) Ricker 4760 (3) Olafsen 4510
Final Snowboard cross standings: (1) Ricker 4760 points (2) Olafsen 4350 (3) Dominique Maltais  3460

March 18, 2010 (Thursday)

Basketball
NCAA Division I Men's Tournament:
First round (seeds in parentheses):
South Regional in New Orleans:
(11) Old Dominion 51, (6) Notre Dame 50
(3) Baylor 68, (14) Sam Houston State 59
South Regional in Providence, Rhode Island:
(2) Villanova 73, (15) Robert Morris 70 (OT)
(10) Saint Mary's 80, (7) Richmond 71
West Regional in San Jose, California:
(13) Murray State 66, (4) Vanderbilt 65
(5) Butler 77, (12) UTEP 59
West Regional in Oklahoma City:
(7) BYU 99, (10) Florida 92 (2 OT)
(2) Kansas State 82, (15) North Texas 62
East Regional in New Orleans:
(1) Kentucky 100, (16) East Tennessee State 71
(9) Wake Forest 81, (8) Texas 80 (OT)
East Regional in San Jose, California:
(11) Washington 80, (6) Marquette 78
(3) New Mexico 62, (14) Montana 57
Midwest Regional in Oklahoma City:
(9) Northern Iowa 69, (8) UNLV 66
(1) Kansas 90, (16) Lehigh 74
Midwest Regional in Providence, Rhode Island:
(14) Ohio 97, (3) Georgetown 83
(6) Tennessee 62, (11) San Diego State 59

Biathlon
World Cup 8 in Holmenkollen, Norway:
Women's sprint:  Simone Hauswald  20:42.4 (0 penalty shots)  Darya Domracheva  20:47.3 (0)  Anna Carin Olofsson-Zidek  20:56.8 (0)
Overall standings after 21 of 25 events: (1) Magdalena Neuner  757 points (2) Helena Jonsson  704 (3) Andrea Henkel  679
Sprint standings after 9 of 10 events: (1) Hauswald 302 points (2) Neuner 300 (3) Olofsson-Zidek 298 (3) Kati Wilhelm  298
Men's sprint:  Martin Fourcade  26:08.1 (0 penalty shots)  Maxim Tchoudov  26:15.2 (0)  Christoph Sumann  26:17.5 (0)
Overall standings after 21 of 25 events: (1) Sumann 677 points (2) Emil Hegle Svendsen  676 (3) Evgeny Ustyugov  637
Sprint standings after 9 of 10 events: (1) Svendsen 320 points (2) Ivan Tcherezov  284 (3) Fourcade 253

Darts
Premier League round 6 in Brighton, England:
Phil Taylor  8–3 Terry Jenkins 
Raymond van Barneveld  7–7 Mervyn King 
Ronnie Baxter  6–8 Adrian Lewis 
Simon Whitlock  4–8 James Wade 
High Checkout: Simon Whitlock 170
Standings after 6 matches: Taylor 11 points, King 8, Baxter 6, Lewis, Whitlock, van Barneveld 5, Wade, Jenkins 4.

Football (soccer)
UEFA Europa League Round of 16, second leg: (first leg score in parentheses)
Fulham  4–1 (1–3)  Juventus. Fulham win 5–4 on aggregate.
Werder Bremen  4–4 (1–1)  Valencia. 5–5 on aggregate; Valencia win on away goals.
Marseille  1–2 (1–1)  Benfica. Benfica win 3–2 on aggregate.
Standard Liège  1–0 (3–1)  Panathinaikos. Standard Liège win 4–1 on aggregate.
Liverpool  3–0 (0–1)  Lille. Liverpool win 3–1 on aggregate.
Sporting CP  2–2 (0–0)  Atlético Madrid. 2–2 on aggregate; Atlético Madrid win on away goals.
Anderlecht  4–3 (1–3)  Hamburg. Hamburg win 6–5 on aggregate.
Wolfsburg  2–1 (a.e.t.) (1–1)  Rubin Kazan. Wolfsburg win 3–2 on aggregate.
Copa Libertadores second stage:
Group 1: Independiente Medellín  0–0  Racing
Standings after 3 matches:  Corinthians 7 points, Racing 4, Independiente Medellín 3,  Cerro Porteño 1.
Group 2: São Paulo  3–0  Nacional
Standings after 4 matches: São Paulo 9 points,  Once Caldas 8,  Monterrey 5, Nacional 0.
Group 5: Cerro  0–0  Internacional
Standings: Cerro 7 points (3 matches), Internacional 5,  Deportivo Quito 1 (2),  Emelec 0 (2).
CONCACAF Champions League Quarterfinals, second leg: (first leg score in parentheses)
UNAM  6–1 (0–2)  Marathón. UNAM win 6–3 on aggregate.
UNAM's result completes a Mexican sweep of the semi-finals, with all four qualified teams from the country.

Freestyle skiing
World Cup in Sierra Nevada, Spain:
Men's moguls:  Guilbaut Colas   Dale Begg-Smith   Pierre Ochs 
Final Standings: (1) Begg-Smith 693 points (2) Colas 615 (3) Jesper Björnlund  552
Women's moguls:  Eliza Outtrim   Margarita Marbler   Heather McPhie 
Final Standings: (1) Jennifer Heil  725 points (2) McPhie 616 (3) Hannah Kearney  616

March 17, 2010 (Wednesday)

Basketball
 The NBA Board of Governors approves Michael Jordan's bid to purchase a majority interest in the Charlotte Bobcats from founding owner Bob Johnson. Jordan, previously a minority owner of the Bobcats, becomes the first former NBA player ever to own a majority interest in a league franchise. (AP via ESPN)

Cross-country skiing
World Cup Final:
Stage 1 in Stockholm, Sweden:
Women's Sprint Classic:  Anna Olsson   Justyna Kowalczyk   Marit Bjørgen 
Overall standings: (1) Kowalczyk 1832 points (2) Petra Majdič  1191 (3) Bjørgen 1024
Final sprint standings: (1) Kowalczyk 575 points (2) Bjørgen 484 (3) Majdič 446
Men's Sprint Classic:  Nikita Kriukov   Petter Northug   Emil Jönsson 
Overall standings: (1) Northug 1331 points (2) Lukáš Bauer  902 (3) Marcus Hellner  793
Final sprint standings: (1) Jönsson 506 points (2) Northug 352 (3) Alexey Petukhov  347

Football (soccer)
UEFA Champions League First knockout stage, second leg: (first leg score in parentheses)
Barcelona  4–0 (1–1)  Stuttgart. Barcelona win 5–1 on aggregate.
Bordeaux  2–1 (1–0)  Olympiacos. Bordeaux win 3–1 on aggregate.
UEFA Women's Champions League Quarter-finals, second leg: (first leg score in parentheses)
Montpellier  2–2 (0–0)  Umeå. 2–2 on aggregate, Umeå win on away goals.
Torres  1–0 (0–3)  Lyon. Lyon win 3–1 on aggregate.
Røa  0–5 (0–5)  Turbine Potsdam. Turbine Potsdam win 10–0 on aggregate.
Copa Libertadores second stage:
Group 1: Cerro Porteño  0–1  Corinthians
Standings: Corinthians 7 points (3 matches),  Racing 3 (2),  Independiente Medellín 2 (2), Cerro Porteño 1 (3).
Group 2: Monterrey  2–2  Once Caldas
Standings: Once Caldas 8 points (4 matches),  São Paulo 6 (3), Monterrey 5 (4),  Nacional 0 (3).
Group 8:
Caracas  0–0  Universidad Católica
Universidad de Chile  2–1  Flamengo
Standings after 3 matches: Universidad de Chile 7, Flamengo 6, Universidad Católica 2, Caracas 1.
CONCACAF Champions League Quarterfinals, second leg: (first leg score in parentheses)
Toluca  3–2 (2–2)  Columbus Crew. Toluca win 5–4 on aggregate.
Cruz Azul  3–0 (1–0)  Árabe Unido. Cruz Azul win 4–0 on aggregate.
AFC Cup group stage, Round 2:
Group C:
Nasaf Qarshi  2–1  Al-Jaish
Kazma  1–0  Al-Ahed
Standings after 2 matches: Nasaf Qarshi, Kazma 6 points, Al-Jaish, Al-Ahed 0.
Group D:
Al-Ittihad  0–0  Al-Qadsia
Al-Nejmeh  3–0  Kingfisher East Bengal
Standings after 2 matches: Al-Ittihad, Al-Nejmeh 4 points, Al-Qadsia 2, Kingfisher East Bengal 0.
Group G:
VB Sports Club  1–0  South China
Muangthong United  –  Persiwa Wamena. Match postponed due to the political unrest in Thailand.
Standings: VB Sports Club 6 points (2 matches), Muangthong United 1 (1), South China 1 (2), Persiwa Wamena 0 (1).
Group H:
SHB Ðà Nẵng  3–2  Geylang United
NT Realty Wofoo Tai Po  0–1  Thai Port
Standings after 2 matches: SHB Ðà Nẵng 6 points, Thai Port 3, Geylang United, NT Realty Wofoo Tai Po 1.

March 16, 2010 (Tuesday)

Basketball
NCAA Division I Men's Tournament:
Opening Round Game in Dayton, Ohio:
Arkansas–Pine Bluff 61, Winthrop 44

Cricket
England in Bangladesh:
1st Test in Chittagong, Day 5:
 599/6d and 209/7d;  296 and 331 (Junaid Siddique 106). England win by 181 runs, lead the 2-match series 1–0.

Cycling
Tirreno–Adriatico:
Stage 7: (1) Edvald Boasson Hagen  3h 52' 36" (2) Alessandro Petacchi  s.t. (3) Sacha Modolo  s.t.
Final general classification: (1) Stefano Garzelli   30h 51' 36" (2) Michele Scarponi  s.t. (3) Cadel Evans  + 12"

Football (soccer)
UEFA Champions League First knockout stage, second leg: (first leg score in parentheses)
Sevilla  1–2 (1–1)  CSKA Moscow. CSKA Moscow win 3–2 on aggregate.
Chelsea  0–1 (1–2)  Internazionale. Internazionale win 3–1 on aggregate.
Copa Libertadores second stage:
Group 3: Juan Aurich  4–2  Alianza Lima
Standings: Alianza Lima 9 points (4 matches), Juan Aurich 6 (4),  Estudiantes 4 (3),  Bolívar 1 (3).
Group 6:
Banfield  0–2  Nacional
Morelia  2–1  Deportivo Cuenca
Standings after 4 matches: Nacional 8 points, Banfield 7, Morelia 4, Deportivo Cuenca 3.
Group 7: Colo-Colo  1–1  Vélez Sársfield
Standings after 3 matches: Vélez Sársfield 7 points,  Cruzeiro, Colo-Colo 4,  Deportivo Italia 1.
CONCACAF Champions League Quarterfinals, second leg: (first leg score in parentheses)
Pachuca  2–1 (1–1)  Comunicaciones. Pachuca win 3–2 on aggregate.
AFC Cup group stage, Round 2:
Group A:
Shabab Al-Ordon  2–2  Al-Karamah
Saham  1–0  Al-Ahli
Standings after 2 games: Al-Karamah, Shabab Al-Ordon 4 points, Saham 3, Al-Ahli 0.
Group B: Churchill Brothers  2–2  Al-Kuwait
Standings: Al-Kuwait 2 points (2 games),  Al-Hilal, Churchill Brothers 1 (1).
Group E:
Al-Rayyan  3–2  Al-Nahda
Al-Riffa  2–1  Al-Wihdat
Standings after 2 games: Al-Rayyan, Al-Riffa 6 points, Al-Nahda, Al-Wihdat 0.
Group F:
Sriwijaya  6–1  Selangor
Bình Dương  3–0  Victory SC
Standings after 2 games: Sriwijaya, Bình Dương 4 points, Victory, Selangor 1.

Golf
 Tiger Woods announces that he will end his self-imposed absence from competitive golf at the Masters in April. (ESPN)

March 15, 2010 (Monday)

Basketball
 Top seeds in the 2010 NCAA Division I Women's Basketball Tournament:
 Dayton Regional: Connecticut (#1 overall seed)
 Memphis Regional: Tennessee
 Sacramento Regional: Stanford
 Kansas City Regional: Nebraska

Cricket
England in Bangladesh:
1st Test in Chittagong, Day 4:
 599/6d (138.3 overs) and 209/7d (49.3 overs);  296 (90.3 overs) and 191/5 (75 overs). Bangladesh require another 322 runs with 5 wickets remaining.

Golf
PGA Tour:
Puerto Rico Open in Río Grande, Puerto Rico:
Winner: Derek Lamely  269 (−19)
Lamely earns his first title on the PGA Tour, becoming the first rookie to win on the Tour since Marc Turnesa won the 2008 Justin Timberlake Shriners Hospitals for Children Open.

March 14, 2010 (Sunday)

Alpine skiing
World Cup in Garmisch-Partenkirchen, Germany:
Team event:  Lucie Hrstková/Šárka Záhrobská/Ondřej Bank/Kryštof Krýzl   Nadja Kamer/Nadia Styger/Fabienne Suter/Marc Berthod/Marc Gini/Sandro Viletta   Elisabeth Görgl/Michaela Kirchgasser/Kathrin Zettel/Romed Baumann/Marcel Hirscher/Benjamin Raich

Athletics
World Indoor Championships in Doha, Qatar:
Men's events:
800 metres:  Abubaker Kaki Khamis  1:46.23  Boaz Kiplagat Lalang  1:46.39  Adam Kszczot  1:46.69
3000 metres:  Bernard Lagat  7:37.97  Sergio Sánchez  7:39.55  Sammy Alex Mutahi  7:39.90
60 metres hurdles:  Dayron Robles  7.34  Terrence Trammell  7.36  David Oliver  7.44
4 × 400 metres relay:  Jamaal Torrance/Greg Nixon/Tavaris Tate/Bershawn Jackson  3:03.40  Cédric Van Branteghem/Kevin Borlée/Antoine Gillet/Jonathan Borlée  3:06.94  Conrad Williams/Nigel Levine/Christopher Clarke/Richard Buck  3:07.52
High Jump:  Ivan Ukhov  2.36  Yaroslav Rybakov  2.31  Dusty Jonas  2.31
Triple Jump:  Teddy Tamgho  17.90 (WR)  Yoandri Betanzos  17.69  Arnie David Giralt  17.36
Women's events:
60 metres:  Veronica Campbell-Brown  7.00  LaVerne Jones-Ferrette  7.03  Carmelita Jeter  7.05
800 metres:  Mariya Savinova  1:58.26  Jenny Meadows  1:58.43  Alysia Johnson  1:59.60
1500 metres:  Kalkidan Gezahegne  4:08.14  Natalia Rodríguez  4:08.30  Gelete Burka  4:08.39
4 × 400 metres relay:  Debbie Dunn/DeeDee Trotter/Natasha Hastings/Allyson Felix  3:27.34  Svetlana Pospelova/Natalya Nazarova/Kseniya Vdovina/Tatyana Firova  3:27.44  Bobby-Gaye Wilkins/Clora Williams/Davita Prendagast/Novlene Williams-Mills  3:28.49
Pole Vault:  Fabiana Murer  4.80  Svetlana Feofanova  4.80  Anna Rogowska  4.70
Long Jump:  Brittney Reese  6.70  Naide Gomes  6.67  Keila Costa  6.63
Shot Put:  Nadzeya Astapchuk  20.85  Valerie Vili  20.49  Natallia Mikhnevich  20.42

Auto racing
Formula One:
Bahrain Grand Prix in Sakhir, Bahrain:
(1) Fernando Alonso  (Ferrari) 1:39:20.396 (2) Felipe Massa  (Ferrari) +16.099 (3) Lewis Hamilton  (McLaren–Mercedes) +23.182
Drivers' Championship standings (after 1 of 19 races): (1) Alonso 25 points (2) Massa 18 (3) Hamilton 15
Constructors' Championship standings: (1) Ferrari 43 points (2) McLaren-Mercedes 21 (3) Mercedes 18
IndyCar Series:
São Paulo Indy 300 in São Paulo, Brazil:
(1) Will Power  (Team Penske) 2:00:57.7112 (2) Ryan Hunter-Reay  (Andretti Autosport) +1.8581 (3) Vítor Meira  (A. J. Foyt Enterprises) +9.7094
Drivers' standings (after 1 of 17 races): (1) Power 50 points (2) Hunter-Reay 40 (3) Meira 35
V8 Supercars:
Clipsal 500 in Adelaide, South Australia:
Race 6: (1) Garth Tander  (Holden Commodore) (2) James Courtney  (Ford Falcon) (3) Mark Winterbottom  (Ford Falcon)
Drivers' standings (after 6 of 26 races): (1) Jamie Whincup  (Holden Commodore) 771 points (2) Winterbottom 714 (3) Courtney 696

Badminton
BWF Super Series:
All England Super Series in Birmingham:
Men's Singles: Lee Chong Wei  def. Kenichi Tago  21–19, 21–19.
Women's Singles: Tine Rasmussen  def. Wang Yihan  21–14, 18–21, 21–19.
Men's Doubles: Lars Paaske/Jonas Rasmussen  def. Mathias Boe/Carsten Mogensen  21–23, 21–19, 26–24.
Women's Doubles: Du Jing/Yu Yang  def. Cheng Shu/Zhao Yunlei  20–22, 21–16, 21–13.
Mixed Doubles: Zhang Nan/Zhao Yunlei  def. Nova Widianto/Liliyana Natsir  21–18, 23–25, 21–18.

Basketball
U.S. college conference championship games:
Men's (winners advance to the NCAA tournament):
Atlantic Coast Conference in Greensboro, North Carolina:
Duke 65, Georgia Tech 61
Atlantic 10 Conference in Atlantic City, New Jersey:
Temple 56, Richmond 52
Big Ten Conference in Indianapolis:
Ohio State 90, Minnesota 61
Southeastern Conference in Nashville:
Kentucky 75, Mississippi State 74 (OT)
Women's (winners advance to the NCAA tournament):
Big 12 Conference in Kansas City, Missouri:
Texas A&M 74, Oklahoma 67
Big South Conference in High Point, North Carolina:
Liberty 68, Gardner–Webb 66
Colonial Athletic Association in Harrisonburg, Virginia:
James Madison 67, Old Dominion 53
Horizon League in Green Bay, Wisconsin:
Cleveland State 66, Butler 57
Missouri Valley Conference in St. Charles, Missouri:
Northern Iowa 54, Creighton 53
Northeast Conference in Brooklyn:
Saint Francis 77, LIU 68
Pacific-10 Conference in Los Angeles:
Stanford 70, UCLA 46
 Top seeds in the men's NCAA Tournament:
 Midwest Region: Kansas (#1 overall seed)
 West Region: Syracuse
 East Region: Kentucky
 South Region: Duke

Biathlon
World Cup 7 in Kontiolahti, Finland:
Women's pursuit:  Darya Domracheva  31:32.6 (1 penalty)  Magdalena Neuner  31:44.7 (3)  Simone Hauswald  31:50.7 (1)
Overall standings after 20 of 25 events: (1) Neuner 719 points (2) Helena Jonsson  687 (3) Andrea Henkel  652
Pursuit standings after 5 of 6 events: (1) Neuner 235 points (2) Henkel 194 (3) Hauswald 182
Men's pursuit:  Martin Fourcade  32:35.1 (1 penalty)  Christian de Lorenzi  32:45.2 (1)  Vincent Jay  32:50.7 (0)
Overall standings after 20 of 25 events: (1) Emil Hegle Svendsen  650 points (2) Christoph Sumann  629 (3) Evgeny Ustyugov  603
Pursuit standings after 5 of 6 events: (1) Simon Eder  196 points (2) Dominik Landertinger  165 (3) Ivan Tcherezov  160

Cricket
England in Bangladesh:
1st Test in Chittagong, Day 3:
 599/6d (138.3 overs) and 131/5 (36 overs);  296 (90.3 overs). England lead by 434 runs with 5 wickets remaining in the second innings.
Zimbabwe in West Indies:
5th ODI in Kingstown, St Vincent:
 161 (50 overs);  165/6 (27.4 overs). West Indies win by 4 wickets; win 5–match series 4–1.

Cross-country skiing
World Cup in Oslo, Norway:
Women's Sprint Freestyle:  Marit Bjørgen   Kikkan Randall   Natalya Korostelyova 
Overall standings: (1) Justyna Kowalczyk  1786 points (2) Petra Majdič  1191 (3) Aino-Kaisa Saarinen  999
Sprint standings: (1) Kowalczyk 529 points (2) Majdič 446 (3) Bjørgen 441
Men's Sprint Freestyle:  Anders Gløersen   Alexey Petukhov   Marcus Hellner 
Overall standings: (1) Petter Northug  1285 points (2) Lukáš Bauer  902 (3) Hellner 759
Sprint standings: (1) Emil Jönsson  463 points (2) Petukhov 321 (3) Northug 306

Cycling
Paris–Nice:
Stage 7: (1) Amaël Moinard   2h 52' 09" (2) Thomas Voeckler  s.t. (3) Alejandro Valverde  + 3"
Final general classification: (1) Alberto Contador   28h 35' 35" (2) Valverde + 11" (3) Luis León Sánchez  + 25"

Football (soccer)
UEFA Women's Champions League Quarter-finals, second leg: (first leg score in parentheses)
Arsenal  0–2 (1–2)  Duisburg. Duisburg win 4–1 on aggregate.

Freestyle skiing
World Cup in Meiringen–Hasliberg, Switzerland:
Men's skicross:  Michael Schmid   Audun Grønvold   Christopher Del Bosco 
Standings after 10 of 11 events: (1) Schmid 715 points (2) Del Bosco 497 (3) Grønvold 450
Schmid wins the title with a race to spare.
Women's skicross:  Anna Holmlund   Ophélie David   Marte Høie Gjefsen 
Standings after 10 of 11 events: (1) David 655 points (2) Ashleigh McIvor  582 (3) Kelsey Serwa  458

Golf
World Golf Championships:
WGC-CA Championship in Doral, Florida, United States:
 Winner: Ernie Els  270 (−18)
 Els wins his second WGC title, which is also his 17th PGA Tour win and 25th on the European Tour.
PGA Tour:
Puerto Rico Open in Río Grande, Puerto Rico:
 Heavy rains on Thursday forced the start of play to be delayed to Friday. The tournament will conclude on Monday.

Nordic combined
World Cup in Lahti, Finland:
HS134 / 10 km:  Jason Lamy-Chappuis   Felix Gottwald   Magnus Moan 
Final Standings: (1) Lamy-Chappuis 1155 points (2) Gottwald 879 (3) Moan 747

Rugby union
Six Nations Championship, week 4:
 46–20  in Paris
Standings (after 4 games): France 8 points,  6,  5, Italy 2,  1.

Ski jumping
Nordic Tournament:
World Cup in Oslo, Norway:
HS 134 (World Cup Final):  Simon Ammann  267.7 points (135.5m/124.5m)  Adam Małysz  258.7 (128.5/136.5)  Andreas Kofler  251.5 (139.5/116.0)
Final World Cup standings: (1) Ammann 1649 points (2) Gregor Schlierenzauer  1368 (3) Thomas Morgenstern  944
Final Nordic Tournaments standings: (1) Ammann 1077.6 points (2) Małysz 1033.0 (3) Morgenstern 990.4

Snowboarding
World Cup in Valmalenco, Italy:
Men's half-pipe:  Michał Ligocki   Roger S. Kleivdal   Patrick Burgener 
Overall standings after 26 of 29 events: (1) Benjamin Karl  5600 points (2) Pierre Vaultier  4950 (3) Andreas Prommegger  4450
Halfpipe standings after 6 of 7 events: (1) Justin Lamoureux  1800 points (2) Janne Korpi  1730 (3) Kazuhiro Kokubo  1600
Women's half-pipe:  Holly Crawford   Ursina Haller   Mercedes Nicoll 
Overall standings after 21 of 24 events: (1) Maëlle Ricker  4760 points (2) Nicolien Sauerbreij  3800 (3) Doris Guenther  3710 (3) Helene Olafsen  3710
Halfpipe standings after 6 of 7 events: (1) Cai Xuetong  3040 points (2) Sun Zhifeng  2805 (3) Chen Xu  1840

Speed skating
World Cup 7 in Heerenveen, Netherlands:
1000 m Men:  Shani Davis   Stefan Groothuis   Mark Tuitert 
Final Standings: (1) Davis 750 points (2) Tuitert 425 (3) Groothuis 355
1000 m Women:  Yekaterina Shikhova   Annette Gerritsen   Natasja Bruintjes 
Final Standings: (1) Christine Nesbitt  472 points (2) Margot Boer  395 (3) Monique Angermüller  351
Team Pursuit Women:  Kristina Groves/Cindy Klassen/Brittany Schussler   Stephanie Beckert/Anni Friesinger-Postma/Katrin Mattscherodt   Masako Hozumi/Nao Kodaira/Maki Tabata 
Final Standings: (1)  430 points (2)  320 (3)  310
Team Pursuit Men:  Håvard Bøkko/Henrik Christiansen/Mikael Flygind Larsen   Mathieu Giroux/Denny Morrison/Lucas Makowsky   Ryan Bedford/Davis/Jonathan Kuck 
Final Standings: (1)  380 points (2)  350 (3)  306

March 13, 2010 (Saturday)

Alpine skiing
Men's World Cup in Garmisch-Partenkirchen, Germany:
Slalom:  Felix Neureuther   Manfred Pranger   André Myhrer 
Final Overall standings: (1) Carlo Janka  1197 points (2) Benjamin Raich  1091 (3) Didier Cuche  952
Final Slalom standings: (1) Reinfried Herbst  534 points (2) Julien Lizeroux  512 (3) Silvan Zurbriggen  365
Women's World Cup in Garmisch-Partenkirchen, Germany:
Slalom:  Marlies Schild   Kathrin Zettel   Maria Riesch 
Final Overall standings: (1) Lindsey Vonn  1671 points (2) Riesch 1516 (3) Anja Pärson  1047
Final Slalom standings: (1) Riesch 493 points (2) Zettel 490 (3) Schild 420

Athletics
World Indoor Championships in Doha, Qatar:
Men's events:
60 metres:  Dwain Chambers  6.48  Mike Rodgers  6.53  Daniel Bailey  6.57
400 metres:  Chris Brown  45.96  William Collazo  46.31  Jamaal Torrance  46.43
1500 metres:  Deresse Mekonnen  3:41.86  Abdalaati Iguider  3:41.96  Haron Keitany  3:42.32
Long Jump:  Fabrice Lapierre  8.17  Godfrey Khotso Mokoena  8.08  Mitchell Watt  8.05
Pole vault:  Steven Hooker  6.01  Malte Mohr  5.70  Alexander Straub  5.65
Shot Put:  Christian Cantwell  21.83  Andrei Mikhnevich  21.68  Ralf Bartels  21.44
Heptathlon:  Bryan Clay  6204  Trey Hardee USA 6184  Aleksey Drozdov  6141
Women's events:
400 metres:  Debbie Dunn  51.04  Tatyana Firova  51.13  Vania Stambolova  51.50
3000 metres:  Meseret Defar  8:51.17  Vivian Cheruiyot  8:51.85  Sentayehu Ejigu  8:52.08
Defar wins the title for the fourth straight time.
60 metres hurdles:  LoLo Jones  7.72  Perdita Felicien  7.86  Priscilla Lopes-Schliep  7.87
High Jump:  Blanka Vlašić  2.00  Ruth Beitia  1.98  Chaunté Howard Lowe  1.98
Triple Jump:  Olga Rypakova  15.14  Yargelis Savigne  14.86  Anna Pyatykh  14.64
Pentathlon:  Jessica Ennis  4937  Nataliya Dobrynska  4851  Tatyana Chernova  4762

Auto racing
V8 Supercars:
Clipsal 500 in Adelaide, South Australia:
Race 5: (1) Garth Tander  (Holden Commodore) (2) James Courtney  (Ford Falcon) (3) Lee Holdsworth  (Holden Commodore)
Drivers' standings (after 5 of 26 races): (1) Jamie Whincup  (Holden Commodore) 720 points (2) Mark Winterbottom  (Ford Falcon) 585 (3) Courtney 558

Basketball
U.S. college conference championship games:
Men's (winners advance to the NCAA tournament):
America East Conference in Burlington, Vermont:
Vermont 83, Boston University 70
Big 12 Conference in Kansas City, Missouri:
Kansas 72, Kansas State 64
Big East Conference in New York City:
West Virginia 60, Georgetown 58
Big West Conference in Anaheim, California:
UC Santa Barbara 69, Long Beach State 64
Conference USA in Tulsa, Oklahoma:
Houston 81, UTEP 73
Mid-American Conference in Cleveland:
Ohio 81, Akron 75 (OT)
MEAC in Winston-Salem, North Carolina:
Morgan State 68, South Carolina State 61
Mountain West Conference in Paradise, Nevada:
San Diego State 55, UNLV 45
Pacific-10 Conference in Los Angeles:
Washington 79, California 75
Southland Conference in Katy, Texas:
Sam Houston State 64, Stephen F. Austin 48
SWAC in Bossier City, Louisiana:
Arkansas–Pine Bluff 50, Texas Southern 38
Western Athletic Conference in Reno, Nevada:
New Mexico State 69, Utah State 63
Women's (winners advance to the NCAA tournament):
America East Conference in West Hartford, Connecticut:
Vermont 55, Hartford 50
Big Sky Conference in Cheney, Washington:
Portland State 62, Montana State 58
Big West Conference in Anaheim, California:
UC Riverside 71, UC Davis 67
Mid-American Conference in Cleveland:
Bowling Green 62, Toledo 53
MEAC in Winston-Salem, North Carolina:
Hampton 57, South Carolina State 48
Mountain West Conference in Paradise, Nevada:
San Diego State 70, Utah 60 (OT)
Patriot League in Bethlehem, Pennsylvania:
Lehigh 58, American 42
SWAC in Bossier City, Louisiana:
Southern 60, Alabama State 47
Western Athletic Conference in Reno, Nevada:
Louisiana Tech 68, Fresno State 66

Biathlon
World Cup 7 in Kontiolahti, Finland:
Women's sprint:  Darya Domracheva  21:17.5 (0 penalties)  Olga Zaitseva  21:25.9 (0)  Kati Wilhelm  21:31.0 (0)
Overall standings after 19 of 25 events: (1) Magdalena Neuner  665 points (2) Helena Jonsson  655 (3) Andrea Henkel  618
Sprint standings after 8 of 10 events: (1) Jonsson 267 points (2) Wilhelm 267 (3) Neuner 262
Men's sprint:  Ivan Tcherezov  (0 penalties) 24:42.4  Emil Hegle Svendsen  (0) 24:49.2  Martin Fourcade  (2) 25:12.5
Overall standings after 19 of 25 events: (1) Svendsen 614 points (2) Christoph Sumann  604 (3) Evgeny Ustyugov  583
Sprint standings after 8 of 10 events: (1) Svendsen 294 points (2) Tcherezov 261 (3) Ole Einar Bjørndalen  225

Boxing
Manny Pacquiao vs. Joshua Clottey in Arlington, Texas: TV bouts:
 Manny Pacquiao def.  Joshua Clottey via unanimous decision to retain the WBO welterweight championship.
 Humberto Soto def.  David Díaz via unanimous decision to retain the WBC lightweight championship..
 Alfonso Gómez def.  José Luis Castillo via technical knockout.
 John Duddy def.  Michael Medina via split decision.

Cricket
Australia in New Zealand:
5th ODI in Wellington:
 241/9 (50 overs);  190 (46.1 overs). New Zealand win by 51 runs; Australia win 5–match series 3–2.
England in Bangladesh:
1st Test in Chittagong, Day 2:
 599/6d (138.3 overs; Alastair Cook 173, Paul Collingwood 145);  154/5 (39 overs).

Cross-country skiing
World Cup in Oslo, Norway:
Women's 30 km Freestyle Mass Start:  Marit Bjørgen   Kristin Størmer Steira   Therese Johaug 
Overall standings: (1) Justyna Kowalczyk  1736 points (2) Petra Majdič  1191 (3) Aino-Kaisa Saarinen  999
Distance standings: (1) Kowalczyk 857 points (2) Bjørgen 540 (3) Steira 517
Kowalczyk has already secured the overall and distance World Cup titles.
Men's 50 km Freestyle Mass Start:  Petter Northug   Pietro Piller Cottrer   Vincent Vittoz 
Overall standings: (1) Northug 1285 points (2) Lukáš Bauer  902 (3) Dario Cologna  735
Distance standings: (1) Northug 659 points (2) Bauer 502 (3) Marcus Hellner  411

Cycling
Paris–Nice:
Stage 6: (1) Xavier Tondó  5h 01' 39" (2) Alejandro Valverde  + 5" (3) Peter Sagan   s.t.
General classification: (1) Alberto Contador  25h 43' 24" (2) Valverde + 14" (3) Roman Kreuziger   + 25"

Field hockey
Men's World Cup in New Delhi, India:
Third place play-off:  3–4  
Final:   1–2  
Australia win the title for the second time.

Figure skating
World Junior Championships in The Hague, Netherlands:
Ladies:  Kanako Murakami  165.47  Agnes Zawadzki  156.79  Polina Agafonova  154.27

Freestyle skiing
World Cup in Åre, Sweden:
Men's dual moguls:  Guilbaut Colas   Maxime Gingras   Patrick Deneen 
Standings after 11 of 12 events: (1) Dale Begg-Smith  613 points (2) Jesper Björnlund  541 (3) Colas 515
Women's dual moguls:  Hannah Kearney   Shannon Bahrke   Jennifer Heil 
Standings after 11 of 12 events: (1) Heil 725 points (2) Kearney 566 (3) Heather McPhie  516
Heil wins the title with one event remaining.

Nordic combined
World Cup in Oslo, Norway:
HS134 / 4 x 5 km team:  Norway  Austria  Germany

Rugby union
Six Nations Championship, week 4:
 27–12  in Dublin
 15–15  in Edinburgh
Standings:  6 points (3 games), Ireland 6 (4), England 5 (4),  2 (3), Wales 2 (4), Scotland 1 (4).
2011 Rugby World Cup qualifying:
European Nations Cup First Division, matchday 9: (teams in bold qualify for 2011 World Cup)
 15–33  in Madrid
 22–10  in Bucharest
 48–11  in Sochi
Standings: Georgia, Russia 24 points (9 matches), Portugal 20 (9), Romania 17 (8), Spain 10 (8), Germany 9 (9).

Snowboarding
World Cup in Valmalenco, Italy:
Men's parallel giant slalom:  Benjamin Karl   Rok Flander   Jasey-Jay Anderson 
Overall standings after 25 of 29 events: (1) Karl 6600 points (2) Pierre Vaultier  4950 (3) Andreas Prommegger  4810
Parallel slalom standings after 9 of 10 events: (1) Karl 6600 points (2) Prommegger 4810 (3) Anderson 4250
Karl claims the title with one event remaining.
Women's parallel giant slalom:  Nicolien Sauerbreij   Nathalie Desmares   Doris Guenther 
Overall standings after 20 of 24 events: (1) Sauerbreij 4800 points (2) Maëlle Ricker  4760 (3) Guenther 4310
Parallel slalom standings after 9 of 10 events: (1) Sauerbreij 4800 points (2) Guenther 4310 (3) Fraenzi Maegert-Kohli  3800

Speed skating
World Cup 7 in Heerenveen, Netherlands:
500 m Men:  Jan Smeekens   Ronald Mulder   Akio Ohta 
Final Standings: (1) Tucker Fredricks  788 points (2) Smeekens 742 (3) Mika Poutala  702
500 m Women:  Jenny Wolf   Annette Gerritsen   Margot Boer 
Final Standings: (1) Wolf 1260 points (2) Boer 700 (3) Wang Beixing  680
1500 m Women:  Kristina Groves   Martina Sáblíková   Brittany Schussler 
Final Standings: (1) Groves 560 points (2) Christine Nesbitt  374 (3) Sáblíková 348
5000 m Men:  Håvard Bøkko   Sverre Haugli   Ivan Skobrev 
Final Standings: (1) Bøkko 455 points (2) Skobrev 430 (3) Bob de Jong  416

March 12, 2010 (Friday)

Alpine skiing
Men's World Cup in Garmisch-Partenkirchen, Germany:
Giant slalom:  Carlo Janka   Davide Simoncelli   Philipp Schörghofer   Ted Ligety 
Overall standings after 33 of 34 races: (1) Janka 1197 points (2) Benjamin Raich  1091 (3) Didier Cuche  952
Janka secures the title with one race remaining.
Final Giant slalom standings: (1) Ligety 412 points (2) Janka 341 (3) Raich 331
Women's World Cup in Garmisch-Partenkirchen, Germany:
Super-G:  Lindsey Vonn   Elisabeth Görgl   Nadia Styger 
Overall standings after 31 of 32 races: (1) Vonn 1671 points (2) Maria Riesch  1456 (3) Anja Pärson  1047
Vonn becomes the first woman since Petra Kronberger (1990–1992) to win three consecutive overall titles.
Final Super G standings: (1) Vonn 620 points (2) Görgl 300 (3) Styger 291

Basketball
U.S. college conference championship games:
Men's (winner advances to the NCAA tournament):
Patriot League in Bethlehem, Pennsylvania:
Lehigh 74, Lafayette 59
Women's (winners advance to the NCAA tournament):
Conference USA in Tulsa, Oklahoma:
Tulane 62, UAB 54
Southland Conference in Katy, Texas:
Lamar 86, Texas A&M–Corpus Christi 59

Biathlon
World Cup 7 in Kontiolahti, Finland:
Mixed relay:  Ann Kristin Flatland/Tora Berger/Halvard Hanevold/Tarjei Bø  (1 penalty loop + 8 missed shots)  Kati Wilhelm/Magdalena Neuner/Erik Lesser/Simon Schempp  (0 + 8)  Katja Haller/Karin Oberhofer/Lukas Hofer/Christian de Lorenzi  (0 + 9)

Cricket
England in Bangladesh:
1st Test in Chittagong, Day 1:
 374/3 (90 overs; Alastair Cook 158*)
Zimbabwe in West Indies:
4th ODI in Kingstown, St Vincent:
 141 (48.2 overs);  142/6 (34.3 overs). West Indies win by 4 wickets; lead 5–match series 3–1.

Cycling
Paris–Nice:
Stage 5: (1) Peter Sagan   3h 34' 15" (2) Mirco Lorenzetto  + 2" (3) Alejandro Valverde  s.t.
General classification: (1) Alberto Contador  20h 41' 40" (2) Valverde + 20" (3) Roman Kreuziger   + 25"

Figure skating
World Junior Championships in The Hague, Netherlands:
Ladies – Short program: (1) Anna Ovcharova  59.80 (2) Kanako Murakami  59.00 (3) Polina Agafonova  56.28
Ice Dancing:  Elena Ilinykh/Nikita Katsalapov  188.28  Alexandra Paul/Mitchell Islam  172.37  Ksenia Monko/Kirill Khaliavin  168.81

Freestyle skiing
World Cup in Grindelwald, Switzerland:
Men's skicross:  Audun Grønvold   Michael Schmid   Christopher Del Bosco 
Standings after 9 of 11 events: (1) Schmid 615 points (2) Del Bosco 437 (3) Andreas Matt  378
Women's skicross:  Kelsey Serwa   Ashleigh McIvor   Danielle Poleschuk 
Standings after 9 of 11 events: (1) Ophélie David  575 points (2) McIvor 537 (3) Serwa 432
World Cup in Åre, Sweden:
Men's moguls:  Jesper Björnlund   Patrick Deneen   Maxime Gingras 
Standings after 10 of 12 events: (1) Dale Begg-Smith  587 points (2) Björnlund 512 (3) Guilbaut Colas  415
Women's moguls:  Hannah Kearney   Jennifer Heil   Shannon Bahrke 
Standings after 10 of 12 events: (1) Heil 665 points (2) Heather McPhie  516 (3) Kearney 466

Ice hockey
 In the longest game in college history, Quinnipiac defeats Union 3–2 in their ECAC Hockey quarterfinal series in the fifth overtime (150:22 in all). (AP via ESPN)

Ski jumping
Nordic Tournament:
World Cup in Lillehammer, Norway:
HS 138:  Simon Ammann  274.5 points (135.0m/133.5m)  Gregor Schlierenzauer  271.4 (132.0/132.5)  Adam Małysz  265.9 (135.5/127.5)
World Cup standings after 22 of 23 events: (1) Ammann 1549 points (2) Schlierenzauer 1346 (3) Thomas Morgenstern  899
Ammann wins the title with one event remaining.
Nordic Tournaments standings after 3 of 4 events: (1) Ammann 809.9 points (2) Małysz 774.3 (3) Morgenstern 743.6

Snowboarding
World Cup in Valmalenco, Italy:
Men's snowboard cross:  Alex Pullin   Mario Fuchs   Mateusz Ligocki 
Overall standings after 24 of 29 events: (1) Benjamin Karl  5600 points (2) Pierre Vaultier  4950 (3) Andreas Prommegger  4450
Snowboard cross standings after 6 of 7 events: (1) Vaultier 4950 points (2) Graham Watanabe  2570 (3) Pullin 2380
Vaultier has already won the title.
Women's snowboard cross:  Lindsey Jacobellis   Maëlle Ricker   Dominique Maltais 
Overall standings after 19 of 24 events: (1) Ricker 4760 points (2) Nicolien Sauerbreij  3800 (3) Helene Olafsen  3710 (3) Doris Guenther  3710
Snowboard cross standings after 6 of 7 events: (1) Ricker 4760 points (2) Olafsen 3710 (3) Maltais 3460
Ricker wins the title with one event remaining.

Speed skating
World Cup 7 in Heerenveen, Netherlands:
500 m Men:  Jan Smeekens   Tucker Fredricks   Ronald Mulder 
Standings after 11 of 12 races: (1) Fredricks 698 points (2) Mika Poutala  657 (3) Smeekens 592
500 m Women:  Jenny Wolf   Margot Boer   Annette Gerritsen 
Standings after 11 of 12 races: (1) Wolf 1110 points (2) Wang Beixing  680 (3) Boer 595
Wolf has already secured the title.
1500 m Men:  Shani Davis   Denny Morrison   Kjeld Nuis 
Final Standings: (1) Davis 630 points (2) Håvard Bøkko  395 (3) Morrison 338
3000 m Women:  Martina Sáblíková   Daniela Anschütz-Thoms   Stephanie Beckert 
Final Standings: (1) Sáblíková 610 points (2) Beckert 535 (3) Anschütz-Thoms 435

March 11, 2010 (Thursday)

Alpine skiing
Men's World Cup in Garmisch-Partenkirchen, Germany:
Super-G:  Erik Guay   Ivica Kostelić   Aksel Lund Svindal 
Overall standings after 32 of 34 races: (1) Carlo Janka  1097 points (2) Benjamin Raich  1059 (3) Didier Cuche  907
Final Super-G standings: (1) Guay 331 points (2) Michael Walchhofer  316 (3) Svindal 314
Guay's second win in four days gives him the Super-G title.
Women's World Cup in Garmisch-Partenkirchen, Germany:
Giant slalom:  Tina Maze   Kathrin Hölzl   Maria Riesch 
Overall standings after 30 of 32 races: (1) Lindsey Vonn  1571 points (2) Riesch 1406 (3) Anja Pärson  1002
Final Giant slalom standings: (1) Hölzl 471 points (2) Kathrin Zettel  394 (3) Maze 372

Basketball
 Euroleague Top 16, matchday 6 (teams in bold advance to the quarterfinals):
Group E:
Panathinaikos Athens  82–79  Maroussi Athens
Regal FC Barcelona  82–64  Partizan Belgrade
Final standings: Regal FC Barcelona 5–1; Partizan Belgrade 3–3; Panathinaikos Athens, Maroussi Athens 2–4.
Group F:
Montepaschi Siena  93–87  Efes Pilsen Istanbul
Real Madrid  64–66  Maccabi Tel Aviv
Final standings: Maccabi Tel Aviv 4–2; Real Madrid, Montepaschi Siena 3–3; Efes Pilsen Istanbul 2–4.
Group G:
Asseco Prokom Gdynia  63–82  Unicaja Málaga
Final standings: CSKA Moscow 5–1; Asseco Prokom Gdynia 3–3; Unicaja Málaga, Žalgiris Kaunas 2–4.
Group H:
Khimki Moscow Region  96–83  Olympiacos Piraeus
Caja Laboral Baskonia  102–90 (OT)  Cibona Zagreb
Final standings: Olympiacos Piraeus 5–1; Caja Laboral Baskonia, Khimki Moscow Region 3–3; Cibona Zagreb 1–5.

Cricket
Australia in New Zealand:
4th ODI in Auckland:
 238 (44.1 overs);  202/4 (31.1/34 overs). Australia win by 6 wickets (D/L); lead 5–match series 3–1.

Cross-country skiing
World Cup in Drammen, Norway:
Women's Sprint Classic:  Marit Bjørgen   Aino-Kaisa Saarinen   Pirjo Muranen 
Overall standings: (1) Justyna Kowalczyk  1736 points (2) Petra Majdič  1191 (3) Saarinen 990
Sprint standings: (1) Kowalczyk 479 points (2) Majdič 446 (3) Saarinen 375
Men's Sprint Classic:  Emil Jönsson   Petter Northug   Andrew Newell 
Overall standings: (1) Northug 1140 points (2) Lukáš Bauer  888 (3) Dario Cologna  735
Sprint standings: (1) Jönsson 427 points (2) Northug 306 (3) John Kristian Dahl  280

Cycling
Paris–Nice:
Stage 4: (1) Alberto Contador  4h 26' 47" (2) Alejandro Valverde  + 10" (3) Samuel Sánchez  s.t.
General classification: (1) Contador  17h 07' 23" (2) Valverde + 24" (3) Roman Kreuziger   + 25"

Darts
Premier League round 5 in Manchester, England:
James Wade  7–7 Ronnie Baxter 
Phil Taylor  7–7 Mervyn King 
Terry Jenkins  4–8 Raymond van Barneveld 
Adrian Lewis  4–8 Simon Whitlock 
Highest checkout: Phil Taylor 161
Standings (after five rounds): Taylor 9 points, King 7, Baxter 6, Whitlock 5, Jenkins, van Barneveld 4, Lewis 3, Wade 2.

Field hockey
Men's World Cup in New Delhi, India:
Semi-finals:
 4–1 
 2–1

Figure skating
World Junior Championships in The Hague, Netherlands:
Ice Dancing – standings after Original Dance: (1) Elena Ilinykh/Nikita Katsalapov  97.46 (2) Alexandra Paul/Mitchell Islam  89.22 (3) Ksenia Monko/Kirill Khaliavin  87.72
Men:  Yuzuru Hanyu  216.10  Song Nan  205.25  Artur Gachinski  199.19

Football (soccer)
UEFA Europa League Round of 16, first leg:
Hamburg  3–1  Anderlecht
Rubin Kazan  1–1  Wolfsburg
Atlético Madrid  0–0  Sporting CP
Lille  1–0  Liverpool
Benfica  1–1  Marseille
Panathinaikos  1–3  Standard Liège
Juventus  3–1  Fulham
Valencia  1–1  Werder Bremen
Copa Libertadores second stage:
Group 2: Nacional  0–2  São Paulo
Standings (after 3 matches): Once Caldas 7 points, São Paulo 6, Monterrey 4, Nacional 0.
Group 5:
Emelec  1–2  Cerro
Deportivo Quito  1–1  Internacional
Standings (after 2 matches): Cerro 6 points, Internacional 4, Deportivo Quito 1, Emelec 0.
Group 7: Deportivo Italia  2–2  Cruzeiro
Standings: Vélez Sársfield 6 points (2 matches), Cruzeiro 4 (3), Colo-Colo 3 (2), Deportivo Italia 1 (3).
CONCACAF Champions League Quarterfinals, first leg:
Árabe Unido  0–1  Cruz Azul

Freestyle skiing
World Cup in Grindelwald, Switzerland: Both Skicross events were postponed due to bad weather.

March 10, 2010 (Wednesday)

Alpine skiing
Men's World Cup in Garmisch-Partenkirchen, Germany:
Downhill:  Carlo Janka   Mario Scheiber   Erik Guay   Patrick Küng 
Overall standings after 31 of 34 races: (1) Janka 1073 points (2) Benjamin Raich  1019 (3) Didier Cuche  878
Final Downhill standings: (1) Cuche 528 points (2) Janka 448 (3) Werner Heel  292
Women's World Cup in Garmisch-Partenkirchen, Germany:
Downhill:  Maria Riesch   Lindsey Vonn   Anja Pärson 
Overall standings after 29 of 32 races: (1) Vonn 1571 points (2) Riesch 1346 (3) Pärson 982
Final Downhill standings: (1) Vonn 725 points (2) Riesch 556 (3) Pärson 385

Basketball
Euroleague Top 16, matchday 6: (teams in bold advance to the quarterfinals, teams in strike are eliminated)
Group G: CSKA Moscow  84–71  Žalgiris Kaunas
Standings: CSKA Moscow 5–1, Asseco Prokom Gdynia 3–2, Žalgiris 2–4, Unicaja Málaga 1–4.
U.S. college conference championship games:
Men's (winners advance to the NCAA tournament):
Big Sky Conference in Ogden, Utah:
Montana 66, Weber State 65
Northeast Conference in Hamden, Connecticut:
Robert Morris 52, Quinnipiac 50

Cricket
Zimbabwe in West Indies:
3rd ODI in Kingstown, St Vincent:
 245/9 (50 overs);  104 (31.5 overs). West Indies win by 141 runs; lead 5–match series 2–1.

Cycling
Paris–Nice:
Stage 3: (1) Peter Sagan  3h 44' 28" (2) Joaquim Rodríguez  s.t. (3) Nicolas Roche  s.t.
General classification: (1) Jens Voigt   12h 40' 26" (2) Sagan  + 6" (3) Luis León Sánchez  + 9"

Figure skating
World Junior Championships in The Hague, Netherlands:
Men – Short program: (1) Grant Hochstein  71.35 (2) Keegan Messing  68.90 (3) Yuzuru Hanyu  68.75
Pairs:  Sui Wenjing/Han Cong  170.71  Narumi Takahashi/Mervin Tran  157.23  Ksenia Stolbova/Fedor Klimov  145.35

Football (soccer)
UEFA Champions League First knockout stage, second leg: (first leg score in parentheses)
Real Madrid  1–1 (0–1)  Lyon. Lyon win 2–1 on aggregate.
Manchester United  4–0 (3–2)  Milan. Manchester United win 7–2 on aggregate.
UEFA Women's Champions League Quarter-finals, first leg:
Duisburg  2–1  Arsenal
Umeå  0–0  Montpellier
Lyon  3–0  Torres
Turbine Potsdam  5–0  Røa
Copa Libertadores second stage:
Group 1: Independiente Medellín  1–1  Corinthians
Standings (after 2 matches): Corinthians 4 points, Racing 3, Independiente Medellín 2, Cerro Porteño 1.
Group 2: Once Caldas  1–1  Monterrey
Standings: Once Caldas 7 points (3 matches), Monterrey 4 (3), São Paulo FC 3 (2), Club Nacional 0 (2).
Group 3: Alianza Lima  2–0  Juan Aurich
Standings (after 3 matches): Alianza Lima 9 points, Estudiantes de La Plata 4, Juan Aurich 3, Bolívar 1.
Group 6: Nacional  2–2  Banfield
Standings (after 3 matches): Banfield 7 points, Nacional 5, Club Deportivo Cuenca 3, Monarcas Morelia 1.
Group 8: Caracas  1–3  Flamengo
Standings (after 2 matches): Flamengo 6 points, Universidad de Chile 4, Universidad Católica 1, Caracas 0.
AFC Champions League, Round 2:
Group C:
Sepahan  0–0  Al-Ain
Pakhtakor Tashkent  1–3  Al-Shabab
Standings (after 2 matches): Al-Shabab 4 points, Pakhtakor Tashkent 3, Sepahan 2, Al-Ain 1.
Group D:
Al-Ahli  0–5  Al-Sadd
Al-Hilal  3–1  Mes Kerman
Standings (after 2 matches), Al-Hilal 6 points, Al-Sadd, Mes Kerman 3, Al-Ahli 0.
Group G:
Gamba Osaka  1–1  Henan Construction
Singapore Armed Forces  0–2  Suwon Samsung Bluewings
Standings (after 2 matches): Suwon Samsung Bluewings 4 points, Gamba Osaka, Henan Construction 2, Singapore Armed Forces 1.
Group H:
Shandong Luneng  0–2  Adelaide United
Pohang Steelers  2–1  Sanfrecce Hiroshima
Standings (after 2 matches): Adelaide United 6 points, Pohang Steelers, Shandong Luneng 3, Sanfrecce Hiroshima 0.
AFC Cup, Round 1:
Group D: Kingfisher East Bengal  1–4  Al-Ittihad
CONCACAF Champions League Quarterfinals, first leg:
Marathón  2–0  UNAM
Comunicaciones  1–1  Pachuca

March 9, 2010 (Tuesday)

Basketball
ULEB Eurocup Last 16, matchday 6: (teams in bold advance to the quarterfinals):
Group I:
Le Mans  79–75  Aris BSA 2003
DKV Joventut  62–68  ALBA Berlin
Final standings: ALBA Berlin 4–2, Aris BSA 2003, DKV Joventut 3–3, Le Mans 2–4.
Group J:
Galatasaray Café Crown  98–111  Hapoel Jerusalem
 Hapoel score 44 points in the final quarter, a record for any quarter in the competition's history.
Power Elec Valencia  91–81  UNICS Kazan
Final standings: Power Elec Valencia 5–1, Hapoel Jerusalem 4–2, UNICS Kazan 3–3, Galatasaray Café Crown 0–6.
Group K:
Benetton Basket  86–70  Brose Baskets
Panellinios BC  77–70  Bizkaia Bilbao Basket
Final standings: Bizkaia Bilbao Basket, Panellinios BC 4–2, Benetton Basket, Brose Baskets 2–4
Group L:
Gran Canaria 2014  81–58  Crvena zvezda
ČEZ Nymburk  84–94  Türk Telekom
Final standings: Gran Canaria 2014 4–2, ČEZ Nymburk, Crvena zvezda 3–3, Türk Telekom 2–4.
U.S. college conference championship games:
Men's (winners advance to the NCAA tournament):
Horizon League in Indianapolis:
Butler 70, Wright State 45
The Summit League in Sioux Falls, South Dakota:
Oakland 76, IUPUI 64
Sun Belt Conference in Hot Springs, Arkansas:
North Texas 66, Troy 63
Women's (winners advance to the NCAA tournament):
Big East Conference in Hartford, Connecticut:
Connecticut 60, West Virginia 32
The Summit League in Sioux Falls, South Dakota:
South Dakota State 79, Oral Roberts 75 (OT)
Sun Belt Conference in Hot Springs, Arkansas:
Middle Tennessee 70, UALR 68 (OT)

Cricket
Australia in New Zealand:
3rd ODI in Hamilton:
 245 (46.2 overs);  248/4 (47.2 overs; BJ Haddin 110). Australia win by 6 wickets; lead 5–match series 2–1.

Cycling
Paris–Nice:
Stage 2: (1) William Bonnet  4h 22'40" (2) Peter Sagan  s.t. (3) Luis León Sánchez  s.t.
General classification: (1) Lars Boom   8h 55' 51" (2) Jens Voigt  + 5" (3) Sánchez  + 10"

Field hockey
Men's World Cup in New Delhi, India: (teams in bold advance to semifinals)
Pool A:
 5–2 
 1–2 
 2–4 
Final standings: Germany 11 points, Netherlands, Korea 10, Argentina, New Zealand 6, Canada 0.

Figure skating
World Junior Championships in The Hague, Netherlands:
Ice Dancing – Compulsory Dance: (1) Elena Ilinykh/Nikita Katsalapov  37.52 (2) Maia Shibutani/Alex Shibutani  34.27 (3) Ekaterina Pushkash/Jonathan Guerreiro  34.20
Pairs – Short Program: (1) Sui Wenjing/Han Cong  60.94 (2) Narumi Takahashi/Mervin Tran  59.54 (3) Ksenia Stolbova/Fedor Klimov  54.26

Football (soccer)
UEFA Champions League First knockout stage, second leg: (first leg score in parentheses)
Arsenal  5–0 (1–2)  Porto. Arsenal win 6–2 on aggregate.
Fiorentina  3–2 (1–2)  Bayern Munich. 4–4 on aggregate, Bayern Munich win on away goals.
Copa Libertadores second stage:
Group 1: Racing  2–1  Cerro Porteño
Standings: Corinthians 3 points (1 match), Racing 3 (2), Independiente Medellín 1 (1), Cerro Porteño 1 (2).
Group 3: Bolívar  0–0  Estudiantes
Standings: Alianza Lima 6 points (2 matches), Estudiantes 4 (3), Juan Aurich 3 (2), Bolívar 1 (3).
Group 6: Deportivo Cuenca  2–0  Morelia
Standings: Banfield 6 points (2 matches), Nacional 4 (2), Deportivo Cuenca 3 (3), Morelia 1 (3).
Group 8: Universidad Católica  2–2  Universidad de Chile
Standings: Universidad de Chile 4 points (2 matches), Flamengo 3 (1), Universidad Católica 1 (2), Caracas 0.
AFC Champions League, Round 2:
Group A:
Esteghlal  0–0  Al-Jazira
Al-Gharafa  3–2  Al-Ahli
Standings (after 2 matches): Al-Gharafa 6 points, Esteghlal 4, Al-Jazira 1, Al-Ahli 0.
Group B:
Al-Wahda  1–2  Bunyodkor
Al-Ittihad  2–2  Zob Ahan
Standings (after 2 matches): Bunyodkor 6 points, Zob Ahan 4, Al-Ittihad 1, Al-Wahda0.
Group E:
Melbourne Victory  0–2  Seongnam Ilhwa Chunma
Kawasaki Frontale  1–3  Beijing Guoan
Standings (after 2 matches): Seongnam Ilhwa Chunma, Beijing Guoan 6 points, Melbourne Victory, Kawasaki Frontale 0.
Group F:
Jeonbuk Hyundai Motors  1–2  Kashima Antlers
Changchun Yatai  9–0  Persipura Jayapura
Standings (after 2 matches): Kashima Antlers 6 points, Changchun Yatai, Jeonbuk Hyundai Motors 3, Persipura Jayapura 0.
CONCACAF Champions League Quarterfinals, first leg:
Columbus Crew  2–2  Toluca

Ski jumping
Nordic Tournament:
World Cup in Kuopio, Finland:
HS 127:  Simon Ammann  251.0 points (128.5m/126.0m)  Adam Małysz  234.1 (123.0/123.5)  Anders Jacobsen  233.9 (121.0/126.5)
World Cup standings after 21 of 23 events: (1) Ammann 1449 points (2) Gregor Schlierenzauer  1266 (3) Thomas Morgenstern  854
Nordic Tournaments standings after 2 of 4 events: (1) Ammann 535.4 points (2) Małysz 508.4 (3) Morgenstern 491.8

March 8, 2010 (Monday)

Basketball
U.S. college conference championship games:
Men's (winners advance to the NCAA tournament):
CAA in Richmond, Virginia:
Old Dominion 60, William & Mary 53
MAAC in Albany, New York:
Siena 72, Fairfield 65 (OT)
Southern Conference in Charlotte, North Carolina:
Wofford 56, Appalachian State 51
West Coast Conference in Paradise, Nevada:
 Saint Mary's 81, Gonzaga 62
Women's (winners advance to the NCAA tournament):
Atlantic 10 Conference in Upper Marlboro, Maryland:
Xavier 57, Temple 55 (OT)
Southern Conference in Charlotte, North Carolina:
Chattanooga 72, Samford 67
West Coast Conference in Paradise, Nevada:
Gonzaga 76, Pepperdine 48
 In another women's game:
 Top-ranked Connecticut breaks their own NCAA record winning streak, defeating Notre Dame 59–44 in the Big East tournament semifinals for their 71st straight win.

Cycling
Paris–Nice:
Stage 1: (1) Greg Henderson  4h 22'17" (2) Grega Bole  s.t. (3) Jérémie Galland  s.t.
General classification: (1) Lars Boom   4h 33' 11" (2) Jens Voigt  + 5" (3) David Millar  + 13"

Field hockey
Men's World Cup in New Delhi, India: (teams in bold advance to the semifinals)
Pool B:
 2–0 
 2–1 
 3–3 
Final standings: Australia, England 12 points, Spain 9, India, South Africa 4, Pakistan 3.

Rugby union
 The Celtic League, currently operating in Ireland, Scotland and Wales, announces that two Italian teams will enter the competition from 2010 to 2011 onward. (ESPN Scrum.com)

Tennis
Davis Cup: (team in bold advance to quarterfinals)
World Group first round, day 3:
 4–1 
Fernando González  def. Dudi Sela  6–4, 6–4, 6–3
Jorge Aguilar  def. Harel Levy  7–6(3), 6–1

March 7, 2010 (Sunday)

Alpine skiing
Men's World Cup in Kvitfjell, Norway:
Super-G:  Erik Guay   Hannes Reichelt   Aksel Lund Svindal   Tobias Grünenfelder 
Overall standings after 30 of 34 races: (1) Benjamin Raich  1019 points (2) Carlo Janka  973 (3) Didier Cuche  846
Super-G standings after 5 of 6 races: (1) Michael Walchhofer  300 points (2) Svindal 254 (3) Guay 231
Women's World Cup in Crans-Montana, Switzerland:
Super-G:  Dominique Gisin   Lindsey Vonn   Julia Mancuso 
Overall standings after 28 of 32 races: (1) Vonn 1491 points (2) Maria Riesch  1246 (3) Anja Pärson  922
Super G standings after 6 of 7 races: (1) Vonn 520 points (2) Andrea Fischbacher  239 (3) Fabienne Suter  234
Vonn has already won the Super-G title.

Auto racing
NASCAR Sprint Cup Series:
Kobalt Tools 500 in Hampton, Georgia:
(1)  Kurt Busch (Dodge, Penske Racing) (2)  Matt Kenseth (Ford, Roush Fenway Racing) (3)  Juan Pablo Montoya (Chevrolet, Earnhardt Ganassi Racing)
Drivers' standings (after 4 of 36 races): (1)  Kevin Harvick (Chevrolet, Richard Childress Racing) 644 points (2) Kenseth 618 (3)  Greg Biffle (Ford, Roush Fenway Racing) 585
World Touring Car Championship
Race of Brazil in Curitiba, Brazil:
Race 1: (1) Yvan Muller  (Chevrolet) (2) Robert Huff  (Chevrolet) (3) Alain Menu  (Chevrolet)
Race 2: (1) Gabriele Tarquini  (SR-Sport) (2) Jordi Gené  (SR-Sport) (3) Menu
Standings (after 2 of 24 races): (1) Tarquini 37 points (1) Muller 37 (3) Menu 30.
World Rally Championship:
Rally Mexico in León, Guanajuato:
(1) Sébastien Loeb /Daniel Elena  (Citroën C4 WRC) (2) Petter Solberg /Phil Mills  (Citroën C4 WRC) (3) Sébastien Ogier /Julien Ingrassia  (Citroën C4 WRC)
Standings (after 2 of 13 events): (1) Loeb/Elena 43 points (2) Mikko Hirvonen /Jarmo Lehtinen  (Ford Focus RS WRC 09) 37 (3) Ogier/Ingrassia 25 (3) Jari-Matti Latvala /Miikka Anttila  (Ford Focus RS WRC 09) 25

Basketball
U.S. college conference championship games:
Men's (winner advances to the NCAA tournament):
Missouri Valley Conference in St. Louis:
Northern Iowa 67, Wichita State 52
Women's (winners advance to the NCAA tournament):
Atlantic Coast Conference in Greensboro, North Carolina:
Duke 70, North Carolina State 60
Big Ten Conference in Indianapolis:
Ohio State 66, Iowa 64
MAAC in Albany, New York:
Marist 66, Fairfield 49
Southeastern Conference in Duluth, Georgia:
Tennessee 70, Kentucky 62
 In another women's game:
 Top-ranked Connecticut crushes Syracuse 77–41 in the quarterfinals of the Big East tournament, tying their own NCAA record for consecutive wins at 70.

Cross-country skiing
World Cup in Lahti, Finland:
Men's 4 x 10 km Relay:  Norway II (Simen Østensen/Roger Aa Djupvik/Sjur Røthe/Kristian Tettli Rennemo)  Norway I (Eldar Rønning/Martin Johnsrud Sundby/Petter Eliassen/Tord Asle Gjerdalen)  Germany (Hannes Dotzler/Tobias Angerer/Philipp Marschall/Tim Tscharnke)
Standings (men): (1)  3634 (2)  3382 (3)  2324
Women's 4 x 5 km Relay:  Norway I (Marthe Kristoffersen/Therese Johaug/Kristin Størmer Steira/Marit Bjørgen)  Germany (Nicole Fessel/Katrin Zeller/Miriam Gössner/Evi Sachenbacher-Stehle)  Italy (Marianna Longa/Antonella Confortola Wyatt/Sabina Valbusa/Arianna Follis)
Standings (women): (1)  3031 (2)  2887 (3)  2409
Standings (overall): (1)  6521 (2)  6413 (3)  4503

Cycling
Paris–Nice:
Prologue: (1) Lars Boom   10'56" (2) Jens Voigt  + 3" (3) Levi Leipheimer  + 6"

Field hockey
Men's World Cup in New Delhi, India: (teams in strike are eliminated)
Pool A:
 9–2 
 0–1 
 2–2 
Standings (after 4 matches): Netherlands 10 points, Germany 8, Korea 7, New Zealand 6, Argentina 3, Canada 0.

Football (soccer)
OFC Champions League Group stage, Matchday 5: (teams in strike are eliminated)
Group B: Lautoka F.C.  0–1  PRK Hekari United
Standings (after 5 matches): PRK Hekari United 10 points, Lautoka F.C. 9, Tafea FC 8, Marist FC 1.

Freestyle skiing
World Cup in Inawashiro, Japan:
Men's dual moguls: Postponed due to fog.
Women's dual moguls:  Aiko Uemura   Jennifer Heil   Shannon Bahrke 
Standings after 8 of 12 events: (1) Heil 585 points (2) Heather McPhie  466 (3) Uemura 377

Golf
PGA Tour:
Honda Classic in Palm Beach Gardens, Florida:
Winner: Camilo Villegas  267 (−13)
Villegas wins his third PGA Tour title.
European Tour:
Malaysian Open in Kuala Lumpur, Malaysia:
Winner: Noh Seung-yul  274 (−14)
Noh wins his first European Tour and second Asian Tour title.
Champions Tour:
Toshiba Classic in Newport Beach, California:
Winner: Fred Couples  195 (−18)
Couples wins his second Champions Tour title in his third career start.

Ski jumping
Nordic Tournament:
World Cup in Lahti, Finland:
HS 130:  Simon Ammann  284.4 points (128.0m/131.0m)  Adam Małysz  274.3 (126.0/130.0)  Thomas Morgenstern  272.4 (124.0/127.0)
Standings after 20 of 23 events: (1) Ammann 1349 points (2) Gregor Schlierenzauer  1242 (3) Morgenstern 809

Speed skating
World Cup 6 in Erfurt, Germany:
500 m Men:  Jan Smeekens   Yuya Oikawa   Mika Poutala   Dmitry Lobkov 
Standings after 10 of 12 races: (1) Poutala 621 points (2) Tucker Fredricks  578 (3) Lee Kang-seok  523
500 m Women:  Jenny Wolf   Margot Boer   Thijsje Oenema 
Standings after 10 of 12 races: (1) Wolf 960 points (2) Wang Beixing  680 (3) Lee Sang-hwa  505
Wolf secures the title.
1000 m Men:  Shani Davis   Stefan Groothuis   Mark Tuitert 
Standings after 6 of 7 races: (1) Davis 600 points (2) Tuitert 320 (3) Denny Morrison  247
Davis has already won the title.
1000 m Women:  Yekaterina Shikhova   Laurine van Riessen   Natasja Bruintjes 
Standings after 6 of 7 races: (1) Christine Nesbitt  432 points (2) Monique Angermüller  315 (3) Margot Boer  305

Tennis
WTA Tour:
Monterrey Open in Monterrey, Mexico:
Final: Anastasia Pavlyuchenkova  def. Daniela Hantuchová  1–6, 6–1, 6–0
Pavlyuchenkova wins her first career title.
Davis Cup: (teams in bold advance to quarterfinals)
World Group first round, day 3:
 4–1 
David Ferrer  def. Stanislas Wawrinka  6–2, 6–4, 6–0
Nicolás Almagro  def. Marco Chiudinelli  6–1, 6–3
 4–1 
Simon Greul  def. Jo-Wilfried Tsonga  4–6, 6–2, 1–0 retired
Julien Benneteau  def. Benjamin Becker  6–2, 7–5
 3–2 
Mikhail Youzhny  def. Somdev Devvarman  6–2, 6–1, 6–3
Rohan Bopanna  def. Teymuraz Gabashvili  7–6(5), 6–4
 2–3 
Robin Söderling  def. Leonardo Mayer  7–5, 7–6(5), 7–5
David Nalbandian  def. Andreas Vinciguerra  7–5, 6–3, 4–6, 6–4
 5–0 
Antonio Veić  def. Júlio César Campozano  6–4, 7–6(4)
Ivan Dodig  def. Iván Endara  6–1, 6–3
 3–2 
Novak Djokovic  def. John Isner  7–5, 3–6, 6–3, 6–7(5), 6–4
Sam Querrey  def. Viktor Troicki  7–5, 6–2
Serbia qualify for the Davis Cup quarter-finals for the first time.
 1–4 
Steve Darcis  def. Jan Hájek  7–6(6), 1–6, 6–4
Lukáš Dlouhý  def. Christophe Rochus  1–6, 7–6(6), 7–5
World Group first round, day 2:
 2–1 
Jonathan Erlich/Andy Ram  def. Jorge Aguilar/Paul Capdeville  6–7(5), 7–6(9), 2–6, 6–1, 6–0

March 6, 2010 (Saturday)

Alpine skiing
Men's World Cup in Kvitfjell, Norway:
Downhill:  Didier Cuche   Aksel Lund Svindal   Klaus Kröll 
Overall standings after 29 of 34 races: (1) Benjamin Raich  1007 points (2) Carlo Janka  937 (3) Cuche 846
Downhill standings after 7 of 8 races: (1) Cuche 496 points (2) Janka 348 (3) Werner Heel  252
Cuche wins his third World Cup Downhill title in four seasons.
Women's World Cup in Crans-Montana, Switzerland:
Downhill:  Lindsey Vonn   Johanna Schnarf   Marianne Abderhalden 
Overall standings after 27 of 32 races: (1) Vonn 1411 points (2) Maria Riesch  1214 (3) Anja Pärson  886
Downhill standings after 7 of 8 races: (1) Vonn 645 points (2) Riesch 456 (3) Pärson 325
Vonn wins her third World Cup discipline title of the season, after the Super-G and Combined titles.

Basketball
U.S. college conference championship games:
Men's (winners advance to the NCAA tournament):
Big South Conference in Conway, South Carolina:
Winthrop 64, Coastal Carolina 53
Atlantic Sun Conference in Macon, Georgia:
ETSU 72, Mercer 66
Ohio Valley Conference in Nashville:
Murray State 62, Morehead State 51
Women's (winners advance to the NCAA tournament):
Atlantic Sun Conference in Macon, Georgia:
ETSU 63, North Florida 62
Ohio Valley Conference in Nashville:
Austin Peay 69, Eastern Illinois 60
 In another men's college game:
 In their last game at Freedom Hall before moving into a new arena next season, Louisville stuns top-ranked Syracuse 78–68.
 In another women's college game:
 Princeton defeats Harvard 78–66 to clinch the Ivy League title and secure its bid to the NCAA tournament.

Cricket
Australia in New Zealand:
2nd ODI in Auckland:
 273/7 (50 overs);  253 (43.2/45 overs). Australia win by 12 runs (D/L), 5–match series level at 1–1.
Zimbabwe in West Indies:
2nd ODI in Providence, Guyana:
 206 (49.5 overs);  208/6 (47.5 overs). West Indies win by 4 wickets, 5–match series level at 1–1.

Cross-country skiing
World Cup in Lahti, Finland:
Men's Pursuit:  Maurice Manificat   Lukáš Bauer   Ilia Chernousov 
Overall standings: (1) Petter Northug  1060 points (2) Bauer 888 (3) Dario Cologna  735
Distance standings: (1) Northug 514 points (2) Bauer 488 (3) Marcus Hellner  379
Women's Pursuit:  Marit Bjørgen   Justyna Kowalczyk   Therese Johaug 
Overall standings: (1) Kowalczyk 1696 points (2) Petra Majdič  1191 (3) Aino-Kaisa Saarinen  910
Kowalczyk secures the title with 7 races remaining since Majdič is out for the rest of the season.
Distance standings: (1) Kowalczyk 857 points (2) Bjørgen 430 (3) Majdič 425
Kowalczyk secures the title with 4 races remaining.

Field hockey
Men's World Cup in New Delhi, India:
Pool B: (teams in bold advance to the semifinals, teams in strike are eliminated)
 2–0 
 4–3 
 2–3 
Standings (after 4 matches): England 12 points, Australia 9, Spain 6, India, Pakistan, South Africa 3.

Football (soccer)
OFC Champions League Group stage, Matchday 5: (teams in strike are eliminated)
Group A: AS Magenta  1–1  Auckland City FC
Standings: Auckland City FC 11 points (5 matches), Waitakere United 8 (4), AS Magenta 3 (5), AS Manu-Ura 1 (4).
Group B: Tafea FC  0–0  Marist FC
Standings: Lautoka F.C. 9 points (4 matches), Tafea FC 8 (5), PRK Hekari United 7 (4), Marist FC 1 (5).

Freestyle skiing
World Cup in Branas, Sweden:
Men's skicross:  Michael Schmid   Christopher Del Bosco   Andreas Matt 
Standings after 8 of 11 events: (1) Schmid 535 points (2) Del Bosco 377 (3) Matt 366
Women's skicross:  Ophélie David   Aleisha Cline   Fanny Smith 
Standings after 8 of 11 events: (1) David 575 points (2) Ashleigh McIvor  457 (3) Kelsey Serwa  332
World Cup in Inawashiro, Japan:
Both the Men's and Women's moguls events postponed due to fog.

Nordic combined
World Cup in Lahti, Finland:
HS130 / 10 km:  Hannu Manninen   Felix Gottwald   Jason Lamy-Chappuis 
Standings after 18 of 19 events: (1) Lamy-Chappuis 1055 points (2) Gottwald 799 (3) Eric Frenzel  688
Lamy-Chappuis has already secured the title.

Ski jumping
World Cup in Lahti, Finland:
HS 130 Team:  Norway (Anders Bardal, Roar Ljøkelsøy, Tom Hilde, Anders Jacobsen)  Austria (Martin Koch, Wolfgang Loitzl, Andreas Kofler, Thomas Morgenstern)  Germany (Andreas Wank, Martin Schmitt, Michael Uhrmann, Michael Neumayer)
Standings: (1)  4634 (2)  1755 (3)  1622

Snowboarding
World Cup in Moscow, Russia:
Men's parallel slalom:  Aaron March   Benjamin Karl   Roland Fischnaller 
Overall standings after 23 of 29 events: (1) Karl 5600 points (2) Pierre Vaultier  4800 (3) Andreas Prommegger  4450
Parallel slalom standings after 8 of 10 events: (1) Karl 5600 points (2) Prommegger 4450 (3) Jasey-Jay Anderson  3800
Women's parallel slalom:  Doris Guenther   Heidi Neururer   Julia Dujmovits 
Overall standings after 18 of 24 events: (1) Maëlle Ricker  3960 points (2) Nicolien Sauerbreij  3800 (2) Guenther 3710
Parallel slalom standings after 8 of 10 events: (1) Sauerbreij 3800 points (2) Guenther 3710 (3) Kober 3470

Speed skating
World Cup 6 in Erfurt, Germany:
500 m Men:  Jan Smeekens   Yuya Oikawa   Ronald Mulder 
Standings after 9 of 12 races: (1) Mika Poutala  551 points (2) Tucker Fredricks  528 (3) Lee Kang-seok  523
500 m Women:  Jenny Wolf   Margot Boer   Heather Richardson 
Standings after 9 of 12 races: (1) Wolf 860 points (2) Wang Beixing  680 (3) Lee Sang-hwa  505
1000 m Men:  Shani Davis   Mark Tuitert   Stefan Groothuis 
Standings after 5 of 7 races: (1) Davis 500 points (2) Tuitert 250 (3) Mo Tae-bum  215
Davis wins the title with two races remaining.
1000 m Women:  Monique Angermüller   Margot Boer   Natasja Bruintjes 
Standings after 5 of 7 races: (1) Christine Nesbitt  400 points (2) Angermüller 270 (3) Boer 245

Tennis
Davis Cup:
World Group first round, day 2: (teams in bold advance to quarterfinals)
 2–1 
Marcel Granollers/Tommy Robredo  def. Yves Allegro/Stanislas Wawrinka  7–6(8), 6–2, 4–6, 6–4
 3–0 
Julien Benneteau/Michaël Llodra  def. Christopher Kas/Philipp Kohlschreiber  6–1, 6–4, 1–6, 7–5
 2–1 
Mahesh Bhupathi/Leander Paes  def. Teymuraz Gabashvili/Igor Kunitsyn  6–3, 6–2, 6–2
 1–2 
David Nalbandian/Horacio Zeballos  def. Robert Lindstedt/Robin Söderling  6–2, 7–6(4), 7–6(5)
 3–0 
Marin Čilić/Ivo Karlović  def. Giovanni Lapentti/Nicolás Lapentti  7–6(3), 6–3, 7–5
 2–1 
Bob Bryan/John Isner  def. Janko Tipsarević/Nenad Zimonjić  7–6(8), 5–7, 7–6(8), 6–3
 0–3 
Tomáš Berdych/Radek Štěpánek  def. Steve Darcis/Olivier Rochus  7–6(0), 6–0, 6–3
World Group first round, day 1:
 2–0 
Nicolás Massú  def. Dudi Sela  4–6, 6–2, 6–2, 6–4
Fernando González  def. Harel Levy  2–6, 6–3, 6–4, 6–4

March 5, 2010 (Friday)

Alpine skiing
Women's World Cup in Crans-Montana, Switzerland:
Super combined: Cancelled
Overall standings after 26 of 32 races: (1) Lindsey Vonn  1311 points, (2) Maria Riesch  1174, (3) Anja Pärson  886
Combined standings after 2 of 2 races: (1) Vonn 160 points (2) Pärson 150 (3) Michaela Kirchgasser  130

Basketball
 U.S. college basketball:
 Men's:
 Cornell defeats Brown 95–76 to clinch the Ivy League title and become the first team to secure its bid to the NCAA tournament.

Cricket
England in Bangladesh:
3rd ODI in Chittagong:
 284/5 (50.0 overs, Craig Kieswetter 107);  239/9 (50.0 overs). England win by 45 runs, win the 3–match series 3–0.

Field hockey
Men's World Cup in New Delhi, India:
Pool A:
 1–2 
 6–0 
 4–3 
Standings (after 3 matches): Netherlands 9 points, Germany 7, New Zealand 6, Korea 4, Argentina, Canada 0 (3).

Football (soccer)
OFC Champions League Group stage, Matchday 5: (teams in strike are eliminated)
Group A: AS Manu-Ura  –  Waitakere United postponed due to a waterlogged pitch.
Standings (after 4 matches): Auckland City FC 10 points, Waitakere United 8, AS Magenta 2, AS Manu-Ura 1.

Nordic combined
World Cup in Lahti, Finland:
HS130 / 10 km:  Magnus Moan   Hannu Manninen   Tino Edelmann 
Standings after 17 of 19 events: (1) Jason Lamy-Chappuis  995 points (2) Felix Gottwald  719 (3) Eric Frenzel  675
Lamy-Chappuis secures the World Cup title and becomes the first French World Cup winner since Fabrice Guy in 1992.

Tennis
Davis Cup:
World Group first round, day 1:
 1–1 
Stanislas Wawrinka  def. Nicolás Almagro  3–6, 6–4, 3–6, 7–5, 6–3
David Ferrer  def Marco Chiudinelli  6–2, 7–6(5), 6–1
 2–0 
Gaël Monfils  def. Philipp Kohlschreiber  6–1, 6–4, 7–6(5)
Jo-Wilfried Tsonga  def. Benjamin Becker  6–3, 6–2, 6–7(2), 6–3
 2–0 
Igor Kunitsyn  def. Somdev Devvarman  6–7(6), 7–6(4), 6–3, 6–4
Mikhail Youzhny  def. Rohan Bopanna  6–4, 6–2, 6–3
 1–1 
Robin Söderling  def. Eduardo Schwank  6–1, 7–6(0), 7–5
Leonardo Mayer  def. Joachim Johansson  5–7, 6–3, 7–5, 6–4
 2–0 
Ivo Karlović  def. Nicolás Lapentti  6–2, 5–7, 6–7(2), 6–3, 6–4
Marin Čilić  def. Giovanni Lapentti  6–4, 6–3, 6–3
 2–0 
Viktor Troicki  def. John Isner  7–6(4), 5–7(5), 7–5, 6–4
Novak Djokovic  def. Sam Querrey  6–2, 7–6(4), 2–6, 6–3
 0–2 
Tomáš Berdych  def. Olivier Rochus  6–3, 6–0, 6–4
Radek Štěpánek  def. Xavier Malisse  6–2, 6–4, 7–6(3)

March 4, 2010 (Thursday)

Basketball
Euroleague Top 16, matchday 5: (teams in bold advance to the quarterfinals, teams in strike are eliminated)
Group E: Partizan Belgrade  66–82  Panathinaikos Athens
Standings: Regal FC Barcelona 4–1, Partizan Belgrade 3–2, Maroussi Athens 2–3, Panathinaikos Athens 1–4.
Group F:
Efes Pilsen Istanbul  75–77  Real Madrid
Maccabi Tel Aviv  97–82  Montepaschi Siena
Standings: Maccabi Tel Aviv, Real Madrid 3–2; Efes Pilsen Istanbul, Montepaschi Siena 2–3.
Group H: Olympiacos Piraeus  102–85  Caja Laboral Baskonia
Standings: Olympiacos Piraeus 5–0, Caja Laboral Baskonia, Khimki Moscow Region 2–3, Cibona Zagreb 1–4.
Olympiacos win the group and claim home advantage in a quarterfinal series against Asseco Prokom Gdynia.

Cricket
Zimbabwe in West Indies:
1st ODI in Providence, Guyana:
 254/5 (50.0 overs);  252/9 (50.0 overs). Zimbabwe win by 2 runs, lead the 5–match series 1–0.

Darts
Premier League round 4 in Exeter, England:
James Wade  7–7 Adrian Lewis 
Ronnie Baxter  8–6 Simon Whitlock 
Mervyn King  8–5 Terry Jenkins 
Phil Taylor  8–2 Raymond van Barneveld 
Highest Checkout: James Wade 148
Standings (after four rounds): Taylor 8 points, King 6, Baxter 5, Jenkins 4, Whitlock, Lewis 3, van Barneveld 2, Wade 1.

Field hockey
Men's World Cup in New Delhi, India:
Pool B:
 0–12 
 5–2 
 2–5 
Standings (after 3 matches): England 9 points, Australia, Spain 6, India, Pakistan 3, South Africa 0.

Football (soccer)
Friendly international match:
 0–2

March 3, 2010 (Wednesday)

Basketball
ULEB Eurocup Last 16, matchday 5: (teams in bold advance to the quarterfinals, teams in strike are eliminated)
Group I: ALBA Berlin  83–71  Le Mans
Standings: Aris BSA 2003, ALBA Berlin, DKV Joventut 3–2, Le Mans 1–4
Euroleague Top 16, matchday 5: (teams in bold advance to the quarterfinals, teams in strike are eliminated)
Group E: Maroussi Athens  58–85  Regal FC Barcelona
Standings: Regal FC Barcelona 4–1, Partizan Belgrade 3–1, Maroussi Athens 2–3, Panathinaikos Athens 0–4
Group G:
Žalgiris Kaunas  93–88  Asseco Prokom Gdynia
Unicaja Málaga  70–76  CSKA Moscow
Standings: CSKA Moscow 4–1, Asseco Prokom Gdynia 3–2, Žalgiris Kaunas 2–3, Unicaja Málaga 1–4.
Asseco Prokom advance to the quarterfinals for the first time in their history.
CSKA secure first place in the group and home advantage in the quarterfinals.
Group H: Cibona Zagreb  82–63  Khimki Moscow Region
Standings: Olympiacos Piraeus 4–0, Caja Laboral Baskonia 2–2, Khimki Moscow Region 2–3, Cibona Zagreb 1–4
PBA Philippine Cup Finals:
Purefoods Tender Juicy Giants 86, Alaska Aces 76. Purefoods wins series 4–0.
Purefoods wins their fifth Philippine Cup and eighth PBA championship, via a 4–0 sweep, third in league Finals history, while Alaska is defeated in the Philippine Cup Finals for the second consecutive year.

Cricket
Australia in New Zealand:
1st ODI in Napier:
 275/8 (50.0 overs);  281/8 (49.2 overs). New Zealand win by 2 wickets, lead the 5–match series 1–0.

Field hockey
Men's World Cup in New Delhi, India:
Pool A:
 0–6 
 1–2 
 1–3 
Standings (after 2 matches): Netherlands 6 points, Germany, Korea 4, New Zealand 3, Argentina, Canada 0.

Football (soccer)
2011 Asian Cup qualification, final matchday: (teams in bold qualify to 2011 AFC Asian Cup)
Group A:
 2–0 
 0–0 
Final standings: Japan 15 points, Bahrain 12, Yemen 7, Hong Kong 1.
Group B:
 1–0 
 0–0 
Final standings: Australia 11 points, Kuwait 9, Oman 8, Indonesia 3.
Group C:  0–1 
Final standings: United Arab Emirates, Uzbekistan 9 points, Malaysia 0.
Group D:  4–0 
Final standings: Syria 14 points, China 13, Vietnam 5, Lebanon 1.
Group E:
 1–0 
 2–1 
Final standings: Iran 13 points, Jordan 8, Thailand, Singapore 6.
European Under-21 Championship qualification: (teams in bold qualify to the playoffs, teams in strike are eliminated)
Group 1:  1–3 
Standings: ,  18 points (7 matches), Moldova 10 (7),  9 (7),  8 (8), Andorra 1 (8).
Group 2:
 2–0 
 1–2 
Standings:  16 points (7 matches),  10 (6), Estonia 9 (7), Georgia 8 (6), Armenia 7 (7), Republic of Ireland 4 (7)
Group 3:  2–0 
Standings:  13 points (6 matches), Italy 10 (6), Hungary 9 (5),  7 (5),  4 (8).
Group 4:  3–2 
Standings: Netherlands 18 points (6 matches),  12 (5), Poland 9 (6),  3 (5),  0 (6).
Group 6:  2–0 
Standings: Montenegro 13 points (6 matches),  10 (4),  10 (5),  5 (8), Bulgaria 4 (7)
Group 8:  1–0 
Standings: ,  11 points (5 matches), Belgium 11 (6),  6 (6), Malta 0 (6)
Group 9:  1–2 
Standings: Greece 16 points (7 matches), England 11 (6),  7 (5),  5 (6),  2 (6)
Friendly international matches (selected):
 0–2  in London
 0–2 
 5–2 
 0–1 
 2–1 
 2–0 
 0–3 
 1–1 
 1–1 
 0–2 
 1–3 
 2–1 
 2–0 
 0–1 
 0–1 
 2–1 
 0–0  in Monte Carlo
 0–1 
 3–1 
 0–2 
Spain get their first win in France in 42 years.
 1–0 
 2–0 
Algarve Cup Final in Faro, Portugal:
 3–2 
USA win the Cup for the seventh time.

Freestyle skiing
World Cup in Norefjell, Norway:
Men's skicross: Cancelled
Women's skicross: Cancelled

March 2, 2010 (Tuesday)

Basketball
ULEB Eurocup Last 16, matchday 5 (teams in bold advance to the quarterfinals, teams in strike are eliminated):
Group I: Aris BSA 2003  84–54  DKV Joventut
Standings: Aris BSA 2003, DKV Joventut 3–2, ALBA Berlin 2–2, Le Mans 1–3.
Group J:
UNICS Kazan  92–89  Galatasaray Café Crown
Hapoel Jerusalem  64–69  Power Elec Valencia
Standings: Power Elec Valencia 4–1, Hapoel Jerusalem, UNICS Kazan 3–2, Galatasaray Café Crown 0–5.
Group K:
Brose Baskets  84–81  Panellinios BC
Bizkaia Bilbao Basket  68–72  Benetton Basket
Standings: Bizkaia Bilbao Basket 4–1, Panellinios BC 3–2, Brose Baskets 2–3, Benetton Basket 1–4
Group L:
Türk Telekom  78–79  Gran Canaria 2014
Crvena zvezda  55–73  ČEZ Nymburk
Standings: Crvena zvezda, ČEZ Nymburk, Gran Canaria 2014 3–2, Türk Telekom 1–4.

Cricket
England in Bangladesh:
2nd ODI in Mirpur:
 260/6 (50.0 overs);  261/8 (48.5 overs, EJG Morgan 110*). England win by 2 wickets, lead the 3–match series 2–0.

Field hockey
Men's World Cup in New Delhi, India:
Pool B:
 4–6 
 2–1 
 2–5 
Standings (after 2 matches): England 6 points, Australia, Spain, India, Pakistan 3, South Africa 0.

Football (soccer)
European Under-21 Championship qualification: (teams in strike are eliminated)
Group 3:  0–1 
Standings:  13 points (6 matches),  9 (4), Bosnia and Herzegovina 7 (5), Luxembourg 4 (8),
Group 4:  3–1 
Standings:  15 points (5 matches), Spain 12 (5),  9 (5),  3 (5), Liechtenstein 0 (6).
Group 5:
 2–2 
 0–3 
Standings:  15 points (5 matches), Iceland 13 (6), Germany 8 (5), Northern Ireland 4 (6), San Marino 0 (6)
Group 10:  2–2 
Standings: Scotland,  13 points (6 matches),  12 (5),  4 (7), Azerbaijan 1 (6)
Friendly international match:
 0–2  in London, England

March 1, 2010 (Monday)

Field hockey
Men's World Cup in New Delhi, India:
Pool A:
 3–2 
 2–2 
 3–0

References

III